= Outline of human–computer interaction =

Overview of and topical guide to human–computer interaction

The following outline is provided as an overview of and topical guide to human–computer interaction:

Human–Computer Interaction (HCI) – the intersection of computer science and behavioral sciences — this field involves the study, planning, and design of the interaction between people (users) and computers. Attention to human-machine interaction is important, because poorly designed human-machine interfaces can lead to many unexpected problems. A classic example of this is the Three Mile Island accident where investigations concluded that the design of the human-machine interface was at least partially responsible for the disaster.

== Definitions ==
Human–Computer Interaction can be described as all of the following:

- A field of science – systematic enterprise that builds and organizes knowledge in the form of testable explanations and predictions about the universe.
  - An applied science – field that applies human knowledge to build or design useful things.
    - A field of computer science – scientific and practical approach to computation and its applications.
  - An application of engineering – science, skill, and profession of acquiring and applying scientific, economic, social, and practical knowledge, to design and also build structures, machines, devices, systems, materials and processes.
    - An application of software engineering – application of a systematic, disciplined, quantifiable approach to the design, development, operation, and maintenance of software, and the study of these approaches; that is, the application of engineering to software.
      - A subfield of computer programming – process of designing, writing, testing, debugging, and maintaining the source code of computer programs. This source code is written in one or more programming languages (such as Java, C++, C#, Python, PHP etc.). The purpose of programming is to create a set of instructions that computers use to perform specific operations or to exhibit desired behaviors.
  - A social science – academic discipline concerned with society and human behavior.
    - A behavioral science – discipline that explores the activities of and interactions among organisms. It involves the systematic analysis and investigation of human and animal behavior through controlled and naturalistic observation, and disciplined scientific experimentation. Examples of behavioral sciences include psychology, psychobiology, and cognitive science.
- A type of system – set of interacting or interdependent components forming an integrated whole or a set of elements (often called 'components' ) and relationships which are different from relationships of the set or its elements to other elements or sets.
  - A system that includes software – software is a collection of computer programs and related data that provides the instructions for telling a computer what to do and how to do it. Software refers to one or more computer programs and data held in the storage of the computer. In other words, software is a set of programs, procedures, algorithms and its documentation concerned with the operation of a data processing system.
- A type of technology – making, modification, usage, and knowledge of tools, machines, techniques, crafts, systems, methods of organization, to solve a problem, improve a preexisting solution to a problem, achieve a goal, handle an applied input/output relation or perform a specific function. It can also refer to the collection of such tools, machinery, modifications, arrangements and procedures. Technologies significantly affect human as well as other animal species' ability to control and adapt to their natural environments.
  - A form of computer technology – computers and their application.

== Styles of human–computer interaction ==
- Command line interface
- Graphical user interface (GUI)
  - Copy and paste, Cut and paste
  - Single Document Interface, Multiple Document Interface, Tabbed Document Interface
  - Elements of graphical user interfaces
    - Pointer
    - Widget (computing)
    - icons
- WIMP (computing)
- Point and click
- Drag and drop
- Window managers
- WYSIWYG (what you see is what you get)
- Zooming user interface (ZUI)
- Brushing and linking
- Crossing-based interface
- Conversational user interface
- Voice computing

== Related fields ==
Human–computer interaction draws from the following fields:

- psychology
  - human memory
  - human perception
    - sensory system
- sociology and social psychology
- cognitive science
- human factors / cognitive ergonomics / physical ergonomics
  - repetitive strain injury
- computer science
  - computer graphics
  - artificial intelligence
  - computer vision
- visualization
  - information visualization
  - scientific visualization
  - knowledge visualization
- design
  - industrial design
  - graphic design and aesthetics
  - information design
  - interaction design
  - process-centered design
  - sonic interaction design
- Interactive Art and HCI
- library and information science, information science
- information security
  - HCISec
- speech-language pathology
- personal information management
- phenomenology

== History of human–computer interaction ==
History of human–computer interaction

- Ivan Sutherland's Sketchpad
- History of automated adaptive instruction in computer applications
- History of the GUI

=== Interaction paradigms ===
- Time-sharing (1959)
- hypertext (Ted Nelson 1963), hypermedia and hyperlinks
- Direct manipulation (ex. lightpen 1963, mice 1968)
- Desktop metaphor (197x XEROX PARC)
- Windows-Paradigm
- Personal computer
- CSCW: Computer Supported Collaborative (or Cooperative) Work, collaborative software
- Ubiquitous computing ("ubicomp") coined 1988
- World Wide Web (Tim Berners Lee 1989)
- Mobile interaction
- "sensor-based / context-aware interaction"-paradigm

=== Notable systems and prototypes ===
- Office of the future (1940s)
- Sketchpad (1963)
- NLS and The Mother of All Demos (1968)
- Dynabook (circa 1970)
- Xerox Alto (1973)
- Xerox Star (1981)
- Apple Macintosh (1984)
- Knowledge Navigator (1987)
- Project Looking Glass (circa 2003 or 2004)
- The Humane Environment (alpha release, 2004)

== General human–computer interaction concepts ==
- accessibility and computer accessibility
- adaptive autonomy
- affordance
- banner blindness
- computer user satisfaction
- contextual design and contextual inquiry
- Feminist HCI
- gender HCI
- gulf of evaluation
- gulf of execution
- habituation
- human action cycle
- human interface device
- human–machine interface
- interaction technique
- look and feel
- mode (user interface)
- physiological interaction
- principle of least astonishment
- progressive disclosure
- sonic interaction design
- thanatosensitivity
- transparency
- usability and usability testing
- user, luser
- user experience and user experience design
- user-friendliness
- user interface and user interface design
- user interface engineering and usability engineering
- handheld devices
- Human–computer information retrieval
- Information retrieval
- Internet and the World Wide Web
- multimedia
- Software agents
- Universal usability
- User experience design
- Visual programming languages.
- Knowbility

=== Hardware ===
Hardware input/output devices and peripherals:

- List of input devices
  - unit record equipment
  - barcode scanner
  - keyboard
    - computer keyboard
    - keyboard shortcut
    - ways to make typing more efficient: command history, autocomplete, autoreplace and Intellisense
  - microphone
  - pointing device
    - computer mouse
      - mouse chording
- List of output devices
  - visual devices
    - graphical output device
    - display device
    - computer display
    - video projector
    - computer printer
    - plotter
  - auditory devices
    - speakers
    - earphones
  - tactile devices
    - refreshable Braille display
    - braille embosser
    - Haptic devices

=== Interface design methods ===
- activity-centered design
- Affordance analysis
- bodystorming
- Contextual design
- focus group
- iterative design
- participatory design
- pictive user interface workshop method
- rapid prototyping
- Scenario-based design (SBD)
- task analysis/task modeling
- user-centered design
- usage-centered design
- User scenario
- Value sensitive design
- Wizard of Oz experiment

=== Usability ===
- Usability testing
- heuristic evaluation
- cognitive walkthrough
- usability lab

=== Models and laws ===
- Hick's law
- Fitts' law
- Steering law
- GOMS – goals, operators, methods, and selection rules
- Keystroke-level model (KLM)

== Cultural influences ==
=== Movies ===
Motion pictures featuring interesting user interfaces:

- 2001: A Space Odyssey (1968)
- Star Wars Episode IV: A New Hope (1977)
- Alien (1979)
- Blade Runner (1982)
- Tron (1982)
- The Last Starfighter (1984)
- Ghost in the Shell (1991/1995)
- The Lawnmower Man (1992)
- Johnny Mnemonic (1995)
- The Matrix (1999)
- Final Fantasy: The Spirits Within (2001)
- Minority Report (2002)
- Simone (2002)
- I, Robot (2004)
- Iron Man (2008)
- Avatar (2009)
- Her (2013)

== Human–computer interaction organizations ==
=== Industrial labs and companies ===
Industrial labs and companies known for innovation and research in HCI:

- Alias Wavefront
- Apple Computer
- AT&T Labs
- Bell Labs
- HP Labs
- Microsoft Research
- SRI International (formerly Stanford Research Institute)
- Xerox PARC

== Persons influential in human–computer interaction ==
- Tim Berners-Lee
- Bill Buxton
- John M. Carroll (information scientist)
- Douglas Engelbart
- Paul Fitts
- Alan Kay
- Steve Mann
- Ted Nelson
- Jakob Nielsen (usability consultant)
- Donald Norman
- Bernhard Preim
- Jef Raskin
- George G. Robertson
- Ben Shneiderman
- Herbert A. Simon
- Ivan Sutherland
- Terry Winograd
