= T Layout =

Mobile web application layout

The T-Layout is an architectural and design concept for web applications, specifically tailored to improve the user experience on mobile devices. It features a horizontally scrollable container divided into three distinct sections, each spanning the full width of the screen, and was developed to optimise space usage and streamline navigation.

== Background ==
The T-Layout introduces horizontal scrolling as a complementary method to the conventional pop-up-based navigation system in mobile web applications. In this layout, the central section which is visible by default upon accessing the application, facilitates the main content of a URL address and is flanked by two "helper" sections. This approach minimises the need for extensive user movements, in order to reach navigation controls typically located at the top of the screen.

It is aimed at enhancing the user experience on mobile devices by providing an easier way to access essential content such as the main navigation, e-commerce related screens, or user account related information, ensuring that those elements are readily accessible while requiring minimal user effort.

The T-Layout was first implemented by E (e-streetwear.com) in their mobile web app layout, and it was inspired by the interfaces of well-tested native mobile apps like Instagram and Revolut.

A study titled "Mobile Navigation and User Preferences Survey" indicated a preference among mobile app users for one-handed usage, primarily navigating with their thumb. These insights led to the T-Layout Experiment, which compared the efficiency of using swipe gestures to access navigational elements against reaching traditional navigation controls.

== Development history ==
It was first released as the mobile layout of E in early 2023. It was originally developed based on six principles: user-centric functionality, lightweight filesize, HTML and CSS implementation with minimal or no use of JavaScript required, suitable both for browser and server-rendering architectures, intuitive design, and improved SEO.

The development of the T-Layout was driven by the necessity for more ergonomic and user-friendly interfaces in mobile web applications. Its design, reminiscent of the letter 'T', emerged as a solution to several usability challenges mobile device users face, emphasising ease of access and efficient screen space utilisation.

In July 2023, E formalised the concept and its technical specifications, introducing it to the web design and development community.

In October 2023 the "Mobile Navigation and User Preferences Survey" was conducted, establishing that the vast majority of individuals prefer to use mobile applications by holding the phone in a one-handed grip, utilising only the thumb for gestures when possible.

The subsequent "T-Layout Experiment", designed to measure the time in seconds and the distance (user effort) in pixels, required to access navigational elements by traditionally tapping on fixed-positioned controls compared to swiping anywhere on the screen. The results proved that swipe gestures require less time and much less effort.

== Styling and features ==
The main characteristic of the T-Layout is its horizontal scrolling feature, which can improve navigation efficiency while preserving the functionality of traditionally structured user interfaces.

Its Implementation can be achieved with a combination of HTML and styling with CSS as well as precompiled Scss and Sass, CSS-in-JS, and styled JSX. It can be either a purely HTML/CSS solution but JavaScript can be utilised as well to add more specific functionalities, while it can be implemented to both existing and new applications. Its application in server-side rendering architectures will ensure that all its underlying principles apply.

Although principally each section in the layout has a distinct role and facilitates specific types of content, the T-Layout as a concept is versatile, and it is adaptable allowing modifications in the layout or how it's implemented to cater to the specific needs of different applications.

== See also ==
- Design thinking
- Interaction design
- Look and feel
- Mobile interaction
- Principles of user interface design
- User-centered design
