= Disclosure =

Disclosure may refer to:

== Arts and media ==
=== Film and television ===
- CBC News: Disclosure, a television newsmagazine series in Canada
- Disclosure (1994 film), an American erotic thriller film based on the 1994 novel by Michael Crichton
- Disclosure (2020 American film), an American documentary film about Hollywood depiction of transgender people
- Disclosure (2020 Australian film), a 2020 Australian drama film written and directed by Michael Bentham
- "Disclosure" (Doctors), a 2003 television episode
- "Disclosure" (Stargate SG-1), a 2003 television episode
- The Age of Disclosure, a 2025 UFO documentary film directed by Dan Farah
- Disclosure Day, a 2026 science fiction film about UFOs directed by Steven Spielberg

=== Music ===
- Disclosure (band), a UK-based garage/electronic duo
- Disclosure (The Gathering album), 2012
- "Disclosure!", a song by Jinjer from Wallflowers (album), 2021

=== Literature ===
- Disclosure (novel), 1994, written by Michael Crichton

== Law and finance ==
- Non-disclosure agreement, a contractual agreement not to disclose specified information
- Disclosure of evidence or discovery, pre-trial phase in lawsuits where parties to the case obtain evidence
- Convention of disclosure, convention that all material facts must be disclosed in financial statements
- Key disclosure law, legislation that requires individuals to surrender cryptographic keys to law enforcement
- Public disclosure, revealing non-confidential information to the public
- Invention disclosure, a confidential document that describes an invention and used to support a patent application
- Prospectus (finance), a disclosure document that describes a financial security

== Other uses ==
- Disclosure movement, conspiracy theory that the US government or other world governments have suppressed evidence of extraterrestrial life
- Disclosure widget, GUI element that is used to show or hide various child elements in the interface
- World disclosure, the way that things become intelligible and meaningfully relevant to human beings
- Reflective disclosure, a model of social criticism proposed by philosopher Nikolas Kompridis
- Self-disclosure, a process of communication by which one person reveals information about themselves to another
- Progressive disclosure, used in digital products to make applications easier to learn and less error-prone

== See also ==
- Disclose (disambiguation)
- Full disclosure (disambiguation)
- Disclosure and Barring Service, a body of the Home Office of the UK providing criminal records disclosure services in England and Wales
- Disclosure Scotland, an executive agency of the Scottish Government providing criminal records disclosure services
- Conflict of interest, a situation in which a person or organization is involved in multiple interests, which may require disclosure
