= Sonic interaction design =

Study of sound as channel of information

Sonic interaction design is the study and exploitation of sound as one of the principal channels conveying information, meaning, and aesthetic/emotional qualities in interactive contexts. Sonic interaction design is at the intersection of interaction design and sound and music computing. If interaction design is about designing objects people interact with, and such interactions are facilitated by computational means, in sonic interaction design, sound is mediating interaction either as a display of processes or as an input medium.

== Research areas ==
=== Perceptual, cognitive, and emotional study of sonic interactions ===
Research in this area focuses on experimental scientific findings about human sound reception in interactive contexts.

During closed-loop interactions, the users manipulate an interface that produces sound, and the sonic feedback affects in turn the users’ manipulation. In other words, there is a tight coupling between auditory perception and action. Listening to sounds might not only activate a representation of how the sound was made: it might also prepare the listener to react to the sound. Cognitive representations of sounds might be associated with action-planning schemas, and sounds can also unconsciously cue a further reaction on the part of the listener.

Sonic interactions have the potential to influence the users’ emotions: the quality of the sounds affects the pleasantness of the interaction, and the difficulty of the manipulation influences whether the user feels in control or not.

=== Product sound design ===
Product design in the context of sonic interaction design is dealing with methods and experiences for designing interactive products having a salient sonic behaviour. Products, in this context, are either tangible and functional objects that are designed to be manipulated, or usable simulations of such objects as in virtual prototyping. Research and development in this area relies on studies from other disciplines, such as:

- product sound quality;
- acoustic ecology, i.e. the relationship, mediated through sound, between living beings and their environment;
- film sound;
- computer and video game sound;
- sound culture, i.e. the study of how the production and consumption of sound have changed throughout history and within different societies.

In design research for sonic products a set of practices have been inherited from a variety of fields. Such practices have been tested in contexts where research and pedagogy naturally intermix. Among these practices it suffices to mention:

- bodystorming, especially when combined with vocal sketching, where participants produce vocal imitations to mimic the sonic behavior of objects while they are being interacted with;
- theatrical practices, such as theatrical metaphors and dramatic performance;
- basic design, based on demonstrations and intersubjectivity;
- video prototyping with sonic overlays;
- Foley artistry in filmmaking;
- acting out sound dramas.

=== Interactive art and music ===
In the context of sonic interaction design, interactive art and music projects are designing and researching aesthetic experiences where sonic interaction is the focus. The creative and expressive aspects – the aesthetics – are more important than conveying information through sound. Practices include installations, performances, public art and interactions between humans through digitally-augmented objects/environments. These often integrate elements such as embedded technology, gesture-sensitive devices, speakers or context-aware systems.

The experience is in the focus, addressing how humans are affected by the sound, and vice versa. Interactive art and music allows researchers to question existing paradigms and models of how humans interact with technology and sound, going beyond paradigms of control (human controlling a machine). Users are part of a loop which includes action and perception.

Interactive art and music projects invite explorative actions and playful engagement. There is also a multi-sensory aspect, especially haptic-audio and audio-visual projects are popular. Amongst many other influences, this field is informed by the development of the roles of instrument-maker, composer and performer merging.

Artistic research in sonic interaction design is about productions in the interactive arts and performing arts, exploiting the role of enactive engagement with sound–augmented interactive objects.

=== Sonification ===
Sonification is the data-dependent generation of sound, if the transformation is systematic, objective and reproducible, so that it can be used as scientific method.

For sonic interaction design, sonification provides a set of methods to create interaction sounds that encode relevant data, so that the user can perceive or interpret the conveyed information. Sonification does not necessarily need to represent huge amounts of data in sound, but may only convey one or few data values in a sound. To give an example, imagine a light switch that, on activation would create a short sound that depends on the electric power consumed through the cable: more energy-wasting lamps would perhaps systematically result in more annoying switch sounds. This example shows that sonification aims to provide some information by using its systematic transformation into sound.

The integration of data-driven elements in interaction sound may serve different purposes:

- to allow the users to refine their actions via auditory feedback. Example: the sonification-enhanced drilling machine which indicates by sound when a wanted orientation to the wall is reached.
- to influence how humans perceive their own body movement.
- to create a sonic gestalt for the interaction which allows users to compare the detailed performance on repeated interactions: for instance rowing strokes may be sonified so that the sportsmen can better synchronize their action.
- to enable novel functions that would otherwise be not available (e.g. a bottle that displays by sound how much fluid is poured into glasses so that the users can more easily fill the equal amount of liquid in different glasses).

Within the field of sonification, sonic interaction design acknowledges the importance of human interaction for understanding and using auditory feedback. Within sonic interaction design, sonification can help and offer solutions, methods, and techniques to inspire and guide the design of products or interactive systems.

== See also ==
- Ecomusicology
- List of human-computer interaction topics
- Design
- Haptic technology
- Social interaction
- Interactivity
- Interaction design
- Interactive systems engineering
- Interaction design pattern
- 3D interaction
- Human–computer interaction
- Sound and music computing
- Soundscape
- User interface
- User interface design
- User-centered design
- Usage-centered design
- Virtual reality
