= Natural mapping =

Natural mapping may refer to:

- Canonical map
- Natural transformation in category theory, a branch of abstract mathematics
- Natural mapping (interface design)
