= Software feature =

Distinguishing characteristic of a program

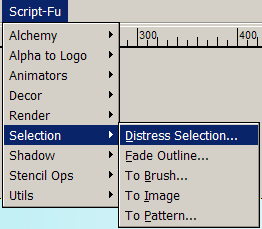
"Distress Selection" software feature in the photo editing program GIMP

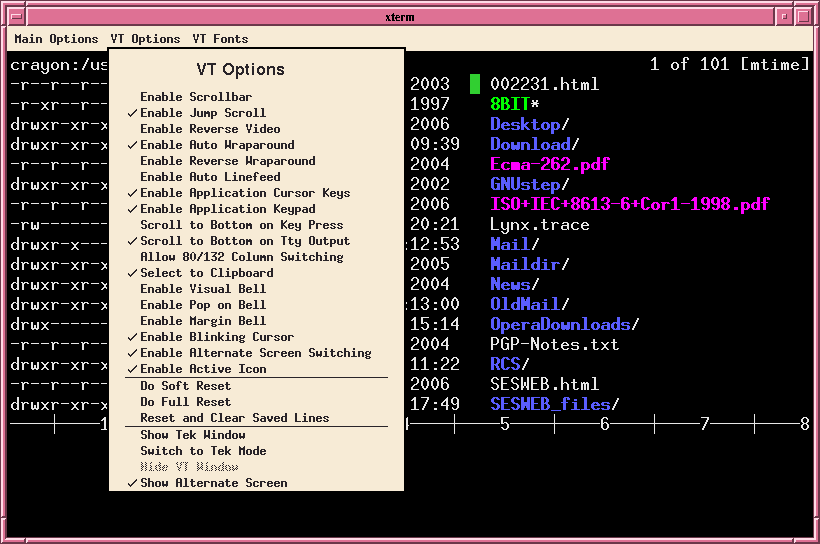
Menu showing a list of available features in the X Window System terminal emulator program xterm

A software feature is "a prominent or distinctive user-visible aspect, quality, or characteristic of a software system or systems", as defined by Kang et al. At the implementation level, "it is a structure that extends and modifies the structure of a given software in order to satisfy a stakeholder’s requirement, to implement and encapsulate a design decision, and to offer a configuration option", as defined by Apel et al.

== Context ==
The term feature means the same for software as it does for any kind of system. For example, the British Royal Navy's HMS Dreadnought (1906) was considered an important milestone in naval technology because of its advanced features that did not exist in pre-dreadnought battleships.

Feature also applies to computer hardware. In the early history of computers, devices such as Digital Equipment Corporation's PDP-7 minicomputer (created in 1964) was noted for having a wealth of features, such as being the first version of the PDP minicomputer series to use wire wrap, as well as being the first to use the proprietary DEC Flip-Chip module which was invented in the same year.

Feature also applies to concepts such as a programming language. The Python programming language is well-known for its feature of using whitespace characters (spaces and tabs) instead of curly braces to indicate different blocks of code.

Another similar high-level, object oriented programming language, Ruby, is noteworthy for using the symbols "@" and "$" to highlight different variable scopes, which the developers claim improves code readability. Its developers also claim that one of its important features is a high amount of flexibility.

The Institute of Electrical and Electronics Engineers (IEEE) defines feature in the (obsolete) standard for software test documentation IEEE 829 as a "distinguishing characteristic of a software item (e.g., performance, portability, or functionality)".

Although feature is typically used for a positive aspect of a software system, a software bug is also a feature but with negative value.

== Examples ==
The terminal emulator xterm has many notable features, including compatibility with the X Window System, the ability to emulate a VT220 and VT320 terminal with ANSI color, and the ability to input escape sequences using a computer mouse or other similar device, and the ability to run on multiple different Unix-like operating systems (e.g. Linux, AIX, BSD, and HP-UX).

== Feature-rich and feature creep ==
Feature-rich describes a software system as having many options and capabilities.

One mechanism for introducing feature-rich software to the user is the concept of progressive disclosure, a technique where features are introduced gradually as they become required, to reduce the potential confusion caused by displaying a wealth of features at once.

Sometimes, feature-rich is considered a negative attribute. The terms feature creep, software bloat, and featuritis refer to software that is overly feature-rich. This type of excessive inclusion of features is in some cases a result of design by committee.

To counteract the tendency of software developers to add additional, unnecessary features, the Unix philosophy was developed in the 1970s by Bell Labs employees working on the Unix operating system such as Ken Thompson and Dennis Ritchie. The philosophy can be summarized as: software programs should generally only complete one primary task and that "small is beautiful".

== See also ==
- Feature-oriented programming
- Product family engineering
- Software design
- Software testing
- Application lifecycle management
- Feature creep
- Scope creep
- Overengineering
