= Interface design (disambiguation) =

Interface Design is the description of how systems or components connect in systems engineering.

Interface design may also refer to:

- User interface design, designing a method for humans to interact with machines
- the design of an interface (computing)
- the design of an interface (object-oriented programming)
