= Full disclosure =

Full disclosure or Full Disclosure may refer to:

== Computers ==
- Full disclosure (computer security), in computer security the practice of publishing analysis of software vulnerabilities as early as possible
- Full Disclosure (mailing list), a mailing list about computer security

== Film and television ==
- Full Disclosure (2001 film), a 2001 thriller film
- Full Disclosure (2005 film), a 2005 comedy/romance short film
- "Full Disclosure" (The West Wing), an episode of the TV series The West Wing
- "Full Disclosure" (Alias episode), an episode of the TV series Alias
- "Full Disclosure" (Steven Universe), an episode of the TV series Steven Universe
- "Full Disclosure" (Girls), an episode of the TV series Girls

== Books ==
- Full Disclosure (book), 2018 memoir by Stormy Daniels
- Full Disclosure (novel), a 1978 novel by William Safire; see List of fictional presidents of the United States (E–F)

== Music ==
- "Full Disclosure", a song by Fugazi from their 2001 album The Argument
- "Full Disclosure (Part 1)" and "Full Disclosure (Part 2)", musical numbers in The Addams Family musical

== See also ==
- Disclosure (disambiguation)
- Conflict of interest, a situation in which a person or organization is involved in multiple interests, which may require disclosure
- Disclosure of evidence, in common law jurisdictions, procedure to obtain evidence from the other party or parties before a lawsuit
