= Disclose (disambiguation) =

Disclose is a Japanese crust punk band.

Disclose may also refer to:

- Disclose.tv, a German disinformation outlet
- DISCLOSE Act, an American federal campaign finance reform bill
- Disclosed, a Singaporean investigative thriller drama

== See also ==
- Disclosure (disambiguation)
