= Extreme users =

Design concept

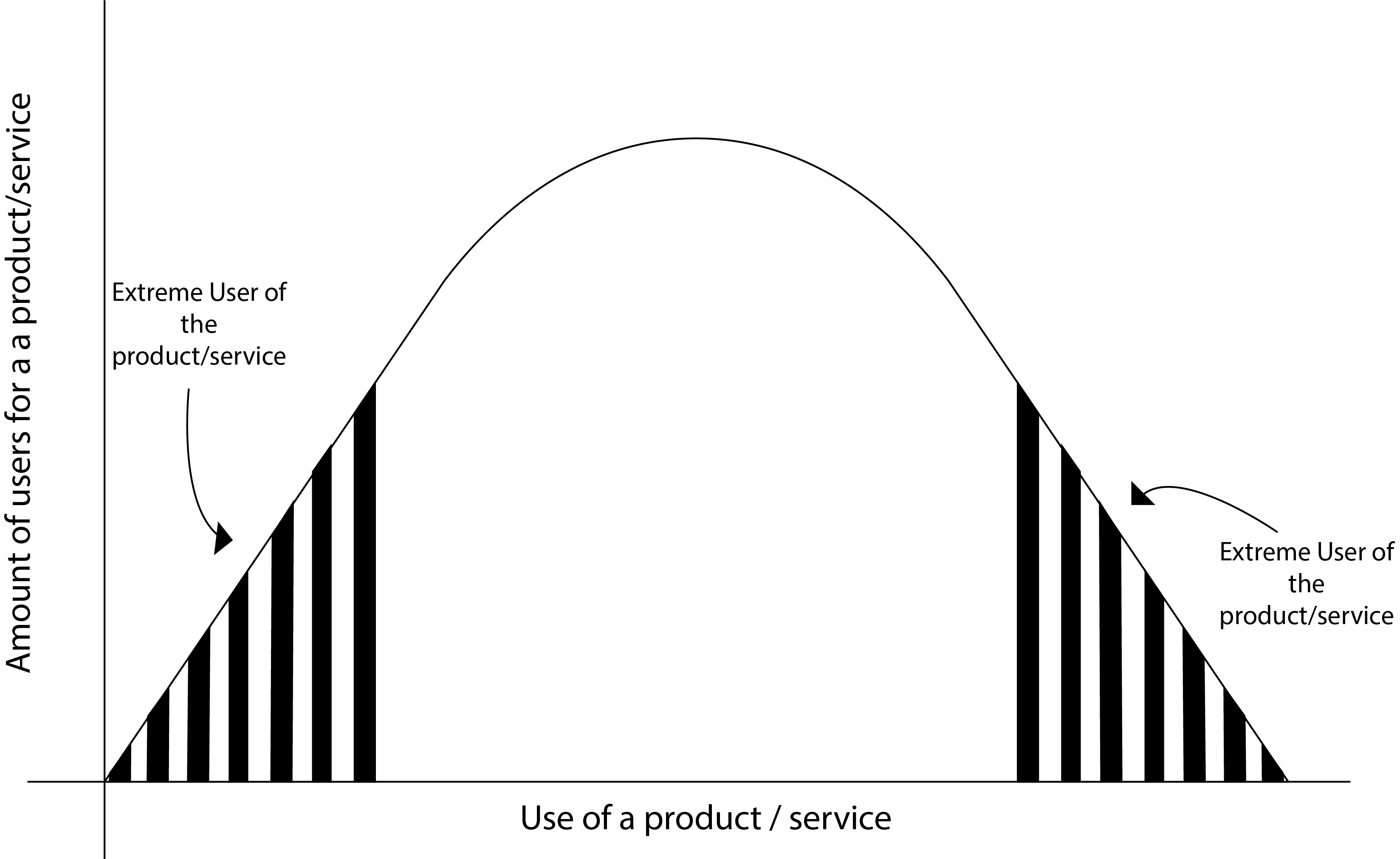
Graph of extreme users, with the peak of the bellcurve representing average users and the ends of the graph representing brink users of a product/service.

Extreme Characters (also known as brink users and extreme users) is a methodology used within user-centered design to represent edge case users of a product, brand, or user interface. The methodology also falls under the broader framework of market segmentation within marketing, as it informs design solutions for both average and extreme users. The concept has been widely adopted in user-centered design and human-centered computing, leading to its application across both online and offline contexts, as well as its integration into marketing communications.

The Extreme Characters methodology is centred on designing for the brink users of a product. The process begins with data collection through focus groups and interviews with specific users, from which a clear goal or user need is identified. By directing design toward needs that are only reflected by a minority of the focus group, the use case of extreme users emerges. Designing for this minority ultimately produces solutions that address both brink users and the average users.

The concept of Extreme Characters has nonetheless faced scrutiny, with critics questioning its role within user-centered design and marketing. The primary criticism is that the methodology risks directing designers and marketers away from the target market of a specific product or service, and that it does not ultimately represent the real end users of that specific product or service.

Through the use of extreme characters, designers can map the varying contexts in which users interact with a product and tailor their designs to meet a broader range of needs. By observing the workarounds that extreme users develop, designers can create solutions that serve not only the general population but also these brink users.

Finally, the influence of Extreme Characters can be seen in the development of several landmark technologies. This is reflected in J. Djajadiningrat's work Interaction Relabelling and Extreme Characters which references both the invention of the first telephone by Alexander Graham Bell and the creation of the first closed source email protocol in 1972 by Vint Cerf. The methodology has also played a significant role in shaping modern technology and its overall design. This can be seen with the creation of the Nintendo Wii and the redesign of the Ford Focus.

== History ==
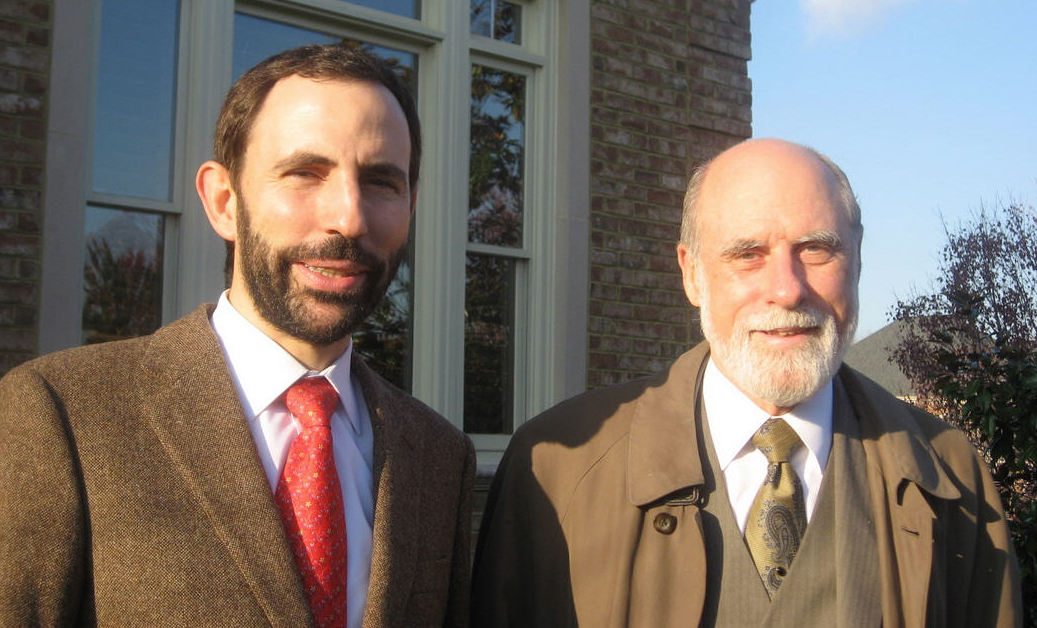
Vint Cerf (right) pictured in 2007

The earliest study that coined the name 'extreme characters/extreme users' for this approach was J. Djajadiningrat's Interaction Relabelling and Extreme Characters. However, the concept of using extreme characters in the user experience of products or services can be dated back to the 19th century.

This can be seen through Vint Cerf's exploration into programming a closed source email protocol in the year 1972. Through his programming, he showed that with electronic letters within a closed network, he was able to talk to his deaf wife while they were both at work.

Another known landmark use of this design methodology before the cultivation of its academic recognition within the aforementioned J. Djajadiningrat's study, was Alexander Graham Bell's work with the deaf, which resulted in his patent for the first telephone. Through designing for a patient with hearing difficulties, a user that is not inherently the 'generic user', Bell's work culminated in one of the biggest telecommunication leaps in the modern age.

=== J. Djajadiningrat's study ===
The first academic recognition of extreme users can be seen within Interaction Relabelling and Extreme Characters: Methods for Exploring Aesthetic Interactions. Through its citing of specific studies in the use-cases of personas, it shows how many studies had been citing the use of extreme characters within their product design without realising their academic potential. J. Djajadiningrat provides the example of Actors, Hairdos and Videotapes - Informance Design, which was already using extreme characters before the technique was coined. Extreme characters were used in this design in order to steer the product design away from the characters within a specific target group. He points out their accidental use of three extreme personas: a drug dealer, the Pope, and a woman with two husbands. Following this, Djajadiningrat judged the development of each character in order to analyse the creation of specific products that helped their contexts. For the Pope, it was a product that gave status; For the drug dealer, it was a product that highlighted secrecy; and finally, for the polyandrous wife, it created a product that designed a management system.

J. Djajadiningrat's study was the first academic recognition of extreme users, and demonstrated the academic advantage of how the methodology can expose emotions and traits that are not obvious for the standard user's scenario. J. Djajadiningrat argues that utilising this technique allows designers to make more humane and human-centric products and services.

== Benefits ==
In accordance with Martin Tomitsch, a lead user experience designer at the University of Sydney, the concept of "extreme characters" stems from the design process as it instills a consideration for the users outside of the typical and generic user base of a product or service. It can, thereby, provide a compelling design solution and focus on constructing abstract data, which is received through user testing, into a complete design solution for the non-stereotypical type of user of a product or service.

It is often used in the early stages of the design, according to Tomitsch, as it allows for the User Experience Designer to generate new problem aspects of the design, and, in hand, promote new elements and aspects of the design concept. Following this, representation of the 'extreme users', through other various User Experience methodologies, such as bodystorming or role playing into these types of characters, can thereby promote a bigger picture of this character profile that the design team can manufacture and ideate a product or service towards.

According to research by Sujithra Raviselvam's team, role-playing not only provides researchers with inspiration for product design, but also enables product development teams to better understand the pain points of extreme users.

As dictated by the Harvard Business School, an exploration of extreme users can be ventured into through several approaches. The analysis of representing extreme characters through personas is one approach, as dictated through Martin Tomitsch's study, however benefits can also present themselves if the extreme consumer is donned by the very designers. This can be seen with studies, such as the redesign of the Ford Focus, that showed the benefits of the methodology by the engineers physically becoming these extreme consumers.

== Acclaimed usages of the methodology ==
=== Chris Messina and Twitter's hashtags ===
Moreover, often cited as the "father of the hashtag", Chris Messina proposed, a tweet in 2007, the concept of having a metadata tag to group specific events that could be generated by users on the social media platform Twitter to create order in constant streams of tweets. It would, thereby, also allow users to find similar messages and people who are also reacting and replying to this specific theme or event.

Twitter's initial response to this proposition by Messina was quoted to be "these things are for nerds". However, through extreme users of the Twitter platform, as seen with the fire that ravaged through San Diego within 2007, the first "social trend" of a hashtag.

The hashtag "#sandiegofire" allowed users to gain easily updates on the fire location and track constant news outlets. Through this, the benefits were seen by the Twitter platform itself and quickly implemented by the platform. Using the hashtag has become prominent on the internet and, as calculated in 2018, 85% of websites that can be found in the top 50 websites (as based by traffic) use the hashtag. as a way for users to be able to group metadata and content under a specific hashtag.

This use of extreme users adopting this service, proposed by Messina, promoted this thinking of designing for use cases for individuals affected by events like the 2007 wildfires and how specific products will benefit them.

=== The Nintendo Wii ===
In accordance with the Harvard University Business School, the Nintendo Wii game console stemmed from Nintendo researching into the extreme users of the gaming market, people who hate playing games on gaming consoles. From this, apparent research took place and resulted in an array of information about the struggles of gaming for the "non-gamer". This included that, at the current gaming environment at the time before the launch of the Wii, consoles were too complicated and that the console controllers were too difficult to operate. In response, the Nintendo Wii was born. The controller used motion as its primary input, emulating real-life movement and eliminating the pain points that non-gamers had with traditional game controllers. Moreover, the system's design used easier-to-understand graphics to avoid the convoluted user interface. The Wii was a revolution and, through Nintendo's analysis of extreme users, it created this instant hit of a console. In all the Nintendo Wii is the fifth best selling game console ever put to market and has forced the competition in the gaming market to follow suit with its motion controlled gestures that mimic real life. This is abundantly clear with the subsequent creations of the Xbox Kinect and the PlayStation Move. Both these products were made as a result of the design leap that the Wii took from its exploration within the extreme characters design methodology.

=== The Ford Focus redesign ===
The Ford team used the extreme user approach in their engineering of the Ford Focus. Through their approach of learning from an extreme demographic of the user of their car, the elderly with physical limitations, they were able to dictate the troublesome tasks for this age bracket. By observing this specific user in this demographic, it was clear that their physical constraints made it difficult for them to use different functionalities of the car, such as the seatbelt.

Through using specific body suits that removed motion around the legs, arms and neck movements, with similar constraints put on for hearing and sight, the engineers became this extreme user.

By the engineers becoming the user, they realized how the different designs of the Focus forced difficulty for users with these physical limitations. Thereby, through this method of design, the end redesign of the car focused on this accessibility factor. It allowed for new features that promoted accessibility for not only this demographic, but provided important features for all consumers.

=== Enhance design creativity and empathy ===
Sujithra Raviselvam's team used instrument adjustments to enable developers to empathize with the inconveniences faced by visually impaired individuals. This allowed developers to develop compassion and connect with them, using the pain points experienced firsthand to inform product development.

The experiment consisted of three steps. First, real visually impaired individuals were interviewed about their daily pain points. Then, simulation equipment (simulating visual impairment glasses) was adjusted based on the visual acuity samples of each participant. Finally, participants entered a darkened room and experienced four different life scenarios: a bus stop, a garden, a fruit market, and various locations within their homes. Volunteers accompanied them throughout to ensure their safety.

The experiment aimed to foster emotional and physical empathy among participants. This empathic connection, along with post-experiment self-assessment, enhanced their development inspiration and provided product "highlights" for subsequent research and development.

=== Participatory Design of a Tennis Ball for the Blind ===
Matt Ratto's team initiated this experiment to improve the performance of blind tennis players. The experiment focused on creating a new tennis ball that met the needs of blind athletes: sustained sound output, ease of ball positioning, and access to information on the court.

This experimental design involved blind athletes in selecting materials and designing the product. This ensured that the product, designed by these extreme users, addressed their specific needs and challenges. The article demonstrates inclusivity by considering critical, reflective, and adversarial design principles. Allowing these users to choose materials is itself a highly inclusive approach. While this process may involve expertise and potential conflicts with material suppliers, both participants and researchers gain valuable experience and inspiration, providing valuable information for future designs.

=== Application on Medical Device Design ===
Sujithra Raviselvam's team identifies the potential latent needs influencing users' experience by adapting from the extreme users methodology. Six groups of total 25 participants study six different medical devices, focusing on four different medical devices aspects such as latent needs, empathy, medical devices, and design approach. The team developed a new latency metric to systematically communicate with professionals. The result is furthermore developing and researching approaching extreme users experience on different stages, helping the designer solve the users needs.

== Critique and criticism ==
As dictated through Prof. Luciano Gualberto's research into user modelling through personas and extreme characters, the concept of using an extreme scenario for a user will, in hand, lead the user to situations that they can design for, but in reality, are viewed as redundant. As taken from his research User Modelling with Personas, he brings to light this concept of designing for an extreme user, a drug dealer, who could use a specific service to hide a 'secret agenda', in this case it would be hiding an organised crime syndicate. However, Gualberto argues that the senior, generic user, will not need the same complexity of secrecy which, in hand, formulates this concept of "feature overload" - where the resources available clutter the real, usable data on the interface of the product or service.

Gualberto's concluding critique of the methodology formulates the concept that the extreme user does lead to new design and user requirements; however, the difficulty of recognising the important user needs within the user experience process as a whole can stem from the extreme user approach. Moreover, the method does not depict the real user need of the system, product or service and, in hand, the methodology does not argue for much creation time during the design process.

=== Over-reliance on a Single User Group ===
Scholars have noted that relying too heavily on one narrowly defined user group can create design limitations. Ratto's team found that designers who focus solely on a specific user group are prone to problems. They conducted a project called "Tennis for the Blind," aiming to make tennis enjoyable for the blind. The team did invite many blind people to participate in the design process, discussing ideas and testing gameplay—the whole process was very active. However, they encountered a bottleneck when creating the physical model—after all, model making requires sight, which the blind could not provide. This shows that even if you are dedicated to serving a specific group, in practice, some groups will inevitably be excluded.

Over-focusing on a specific group also brings another problem: it can easily lead to neglecting the average user. The final product may be suitable only for a small group of people, while most people will find it clunky. For example, if only blind people are considered, sighted people may not understand how to play. Furthermore, designers can easily get bogged down in details, focusing only on solving specific needs while neglecting the most basic functionality and user experience.

Over-focusing on specific needs can actually make products increasingly niche. The design difficulty also increases—after all, meeting specific needs usually requires additional time, tools, and expertise. Therefore, the key is to find a balance that makes it easy for both professional and ordinary users to use.
