= Usability inspection =

Methods used to evaluate a user interface

Usability inspection is the name for a set of methods where an evaluator inspects a user interface. This is in contrast to usability testing where the usability of the interface is evaluated by testing it on real users. Usability inspections can generally be used early in the development process by evaluating prototypes or specifications for the system that can't be tested on users. Usability inspection methods are generally considered to be less costly to implement than testing on users.

Usability inspection methods include:

- Cognitive walkthrough (task-specific)
- Pluralistic walkthrough
- Heuristic evaluation (general), or (domain or culture-specific)
- Action Analysis
- Guideline scoring or testing

== See also ==
- Heuristic evaluation
