= Don Norman =

American researcher, professor, and writer (born 1935)

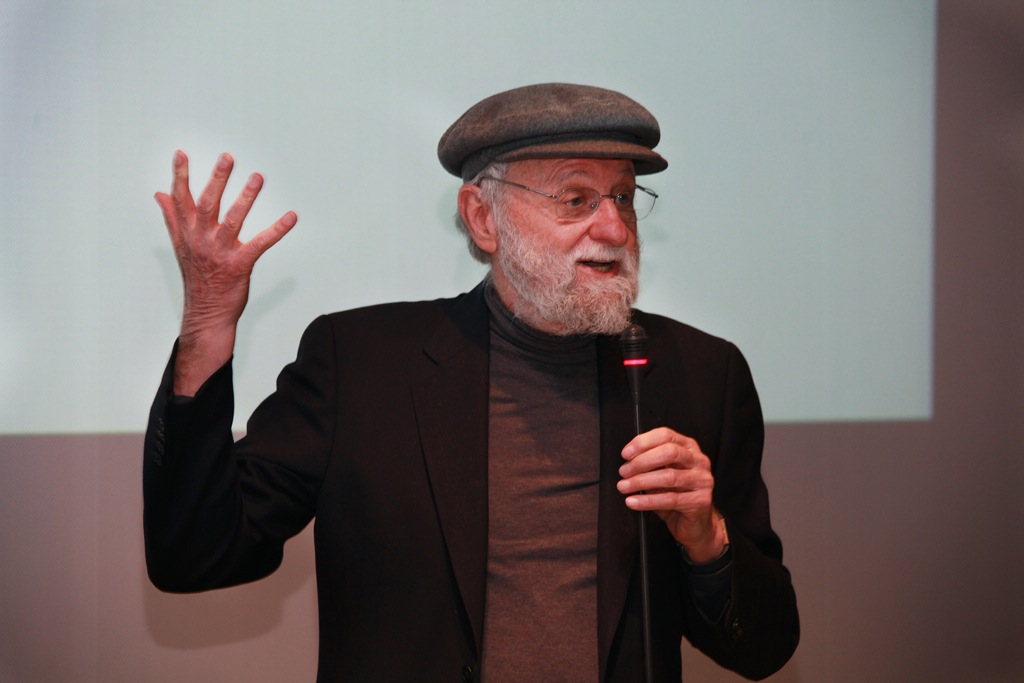
- Norman in 2011
- Born: Donald Arthur Norman; December 25, 1935 (age 90)
- Education: MIT; University of Pennsylvania
- Known for: The Design of Everyday Things; Cognitive ergonomics User-centered design
- Scientific career
- Fields: Cognitive science Usability engineering
- Workplaces: Northwestern University; University of California, San Diego; Nielsen Norman Group; Korea Advanced Institute of Science and Technology
- Thesis: Sensory Thresholds And Response Biases In Detection Experiments, A Theoretical And Experimental Analysis (1962)
- Doctoral advisor: R. Duncan Luce
- Doctoral students: Michael I. Jordan Naomi Miyake Abigail Sellen
- Website: jnd.org

Donald Arthur Norman (born December 25, 1935) is an American researcher, professor, and author. Norman is the founding director of The Design Lab at University of California, San Diego. He is best known for his books on design, especially The Design of Everyday Things. He is widely regarded for his expertise in the fields of design, usability engineering, and cognitive science, and has shaped the development of the field of cognitive systems engineering. He is a co-founder of the Nielsen Norman Group, along with Jakob Nielsen. He is also an IDEO fellow and a member of the Board of Trustees of IIT Institute of Design in Chicago. He also holds the title of Professor Emeritus of Cognitive Science at the University of California, San Diego. Norman is an active Distinguished Visiting Professor at the Korea Advanced Institute of Science and Technology (KAIST), where he spends two months a year teaching.

Much of Norman's work involves the advocacy of user-centered design. His books all have the underlying purpose of furthering the field of design, from doors to computers. Norman has taken a controversial stance in saying that the design research community has had little impact in the innovation of products, and that while academics can help in refining existing products, it is technologists that accomplish the breakthroughs. To this end, Norman named his website with the initialism JND (just-noticeable difference) to signify his endeavors to make a difference.

== Early academics ==
In 1957, Norman received a B.S. degree in electrical engineering from Massachusetts Institute of Technology (MIT). Norman received an M.S. degree in electrical engineering from the University of Pennsylvania. He received a PhD in psychology from the University of Pennsylvania. He was one of the earliest graduates from the Mathematical Psychology group at University of Pennsylvania and his advisor was Duncan Luce.

After graduating, Norman took up a postdoctoral fellowship at the Center for Cognitive Studies at Harvard University and within a year became a lecturer.

After four years with the Center, Norman took a position as an associate professor in the Psychology Department at University of California, San Diego (UCSD). Norman applied his training as an engineer and computer scientist, and as an experimental and mathematical psychologist, to the emerging discipline of cognitive science. Norman eventually became founding chair of the Department of Cognitive Science and chair of the Department of Psychology.

At UCSD, Norman was a founder of the Institute for Cognitive Science and one of the organizers of the Cognitive Science Society (along with Roger Schank, Allan Collins, and others), which held its first meeting at the UCSD campus in 1979.

Together with psychologist Tim Shallice, Norman proposed a framework of attentional control of executive functioning. One of the components of the Norman-Shallice model is the supervisory attentional system.

== Cognitive engineering career ==
Norman made the transition from cognitive science to cognitive engineering by entering the field as a consultant and writer. His article "The truth about Unix: The user interface is horrid" in Datamation (1981) catapulted him to a position of prominence in the computer world. Soon after, his career took off outside of academia, although he still remained active at UCSD until 1993. Norman continued his work to further human-centered design by serving on numerous university and government advisory boards such as the Defense Advanced Research Projects Agency (DARPA). He currently serves on numerous committees and advisory boards like at Motorola, the Toyota National College of Technology, TED Conference, Panasonic, Encyclopædia Britannica and many more.

Norman was also part of a select team flown in to investigate the 1979 Three Mile Island nuclear accident.

In 1993, Norman left UCSD to join Apple Computer, initially as an Apple Fellow as a User Experience Architect (the first use of the phrase "User Experience" in a job title), and then as the Vice President of the Advanced Technology Group. He later worked for Hewlett-Packard before joining with Jakob Nielsen to form the Nielsen Norman Group in 1998. He returned to academia as a professor of computer science at Northwestern University, where he was co-director of the Segal Design Institute until 2010. In 2014, he returned to UCSD to become director of the newly established The Design Lab housed at the California Institute for Telecommunications and Information Technology.

== Awards and honors ==
Norman has received many awards for his work. He received two honorary degrees, one "S. V. della laurea ad honorem" in Psychology from the University of Padua in 1995 and one doctorate in Industrial Design and Engineering from Delft University of Technology. In 2001, he was inducted as a Fellow of the Association for Computing Machinery (ACM) and won the Rigo Award from SIGDOC, the Association for Computing Machinery's Special Interest Group (SIG) on the Design of Communication (DOC). In 2006, he received the Benjamin Franklin Medal in Computer and Cognitive Science. In 2009, Norman was elected an Honorary Fellow of the Design Research Society. In 2011 Norman was elected a member of the National Academy of Engineering for the development of design principles based on human cognition that enhance the interaction between people and technology.

== Nielsen Norman Group ==
Norman, alongside colleague Jakob Nielsen, formed the Nielsen Norman Group (NN/g) in 1998. The company's vision is to help designers and other companies move toward more human-centered products and internet interactions, and are pioneers in the field of user experience design.

== User-centered design ==
In 1986, Norman introduced the term "user-centered design" in the book User Centered System Design: New Perspectives on Human-computer Interaction, a book edited by him and by Stephen W. Draper. In the introduction of the book, the idea that designers should aim their efforts at the people who will use the system is introduced:

People are so adaptable that they are capable of shouldering the entire burden of accommodation to an artifact, but skillful designers make large parts of this burden vanish by adapting the artifact to the users.

In his book The Design of Everyday Things, Norman uses the term "user-centered design" to describe design based on the needs of the user, leaving aside what he deems secondary considerations, such as aesthetics. User-centered design involves simplifying the structure of tasks, making things visible, getting the mapping right, exploiting the powers of constraint, designing for error, explaining affordances and the seven stages of action. The principles and characteristics outlined in the book are relatable to the field of product design, both in a physical and a digital context.

In his book The Things that Make Us Smart: Defending the Human Attribute in the Age of the Machine, Norman uses the term "cognitive artifacts" to describe "those artificial devices that maintain, display, or operate upon information in order to serve a representational function and that affect human cognitive performance". Similar to his The Design of Everyday Things book, Norman argues for the development of machines that fit our minds, rather than have our minds be conformed to the machine.

On the Revised Edition of The Design of Everyday Things, Norman backtracks on his previous claims about aesthetics and removed the term User-Centered Design altogether. In the preface of the book, he says :

The first edition of the book focused upon making products understandable and usable. The total experience of a product covers much more than its usability: aesthetics, pleasure, and fun play critically important roles. There was no discussion of pleasure, enjoyment and emotion, Emotion is so important that I wrote an entire book, Emotional Design, about the role it plays in design.

He instead currently uses the term human-centered design and defines it as: "an approach that puts human needs, capabilities, and behavior first, then designs to accommodate those needs, capabilities, and ways of behaving."

== Don Norman Design Award ==
The Don Norman Design Award organization was created in 2023. Don Norman is co-director of the non-profit, which he founded.

== Bibliography ==
He is on numerous educational, private, and public sector advisory boards, including the editorial board of Encyclopædia Britannica. Norman published several important books during his time at UCSD, one of which, User Centered System Design, obliquely referred to the university in the initials of its title. This is a list of select publications.

=== Psychology books ===
- Norman, Donald A. (1983). Learning and Memory. W H Freeman & Co. ISBN 0716713004.
- Lindsay, Peter H.; Norman, Donald A. (1972). Human information processing: an introduction to psychology. Academic Press.
- Norman, Donald A. (1976). Memory and Attention: An Introduction to Human Information Processing. Series in Psychology (2 ed.). John Wiley & Sons Inc. ISBN 0471651370.
- Norman, Donald A. (1969). Memory and Attention: An Introduction to Human Information Processing. John Wiley & Sons Inc. ISBN 0471651311.

=== Usability books ===
- Norman, Donald A. (2023). Design for a Better World. MIT Press. ISBN 978-0262047951.
- Norman, Donald A. (2013). The Design of Everyday Things. Revised and expanded. Basic Books. ISBN 9780465050659.
- Norman, Donald A. (2010). Living with Complexity. Cambridge, Mass.: MIT Press. ISBN 978-0262014861.
- Norman, Donald A. (2007). The Design of Future Things. Basic Books. ISBN 978-0465002276.
- Norman, Donald A. (2005). Emotional Design: Why We Love (or Hate) Everyday Things. Basic Books. ISBN 0465051367.
- Norman, Donald A. (1998). The Invisible Computer: Why Good Products Can Fail, the Personal Computer Is So Complex, and Information Appliances Are the Solution. Cambridge, Mass.: MIT Press. ISBN 9780262140652.
- Norman, Donald A. (1993). Turn Signals Are The Facial Expressions Of Automobiles. Basic Books. ISBN 9780201622362.
- Norman, Donald A. (1993). Things That Make Us Smart: Defending Human Attributes In The Age Of The Machine. William Patrick Book. Basic Books. ISBN 0201626950.
- Norman, Donald A. (1988). The Psychology of Everyday Things (1 ed.). Basic Books. ISBN 0465067093.

=== Other publications ===
- The Trouble with Unix: The User Interface is Horrid. Datamation, 27 (12) 1981, November, pp. 139–150. Reprinted in Pylyshyn, Z. W., & Bannon, L. J., eds. Perspectives on the Computer Revolution, 2nd revised edition, Hillsdale, NJ: Ablex, 1989.
- Direct manipulation interfaces (1985) about direct manipulation interfaces in collaboration with E. L. Hutchins (first author) and J.D. Hollan
- User Centered System Design: New Perspectives on Human-Computer Interaction (1986) (editor in collaboration with Stephen Draper)
- Norman, Donald A. (1994). Defending Human Attributes in the Age of the Machine (CD-ROM for Mac). Voyager Company. ASIN B000CIQ42I. Combining his books, Design of Everyday Things, Turn Signals Are the Facial Expressions of Automobiles, Things That Make Us Smart, with various technical reports.

== See also ==
- Human action cycle
- Human-computer interaction
- Human-centered design
- User-centered design
- Interaction design

Awards
Preceded by Barbara Mirel	ACM SIGDOC Rigo Award; 2001	Succeeded by Stephen Doheny-Farina
Preceded by Aravind Joshi	Benjamin Franklin Medal in Computer and Cognitive Science; 2006	Succeeded by Stuart Card
