= PICTIVE =

Participatory design method

PICTIVE (Plastic Interface for Collaborative Technology Initiative through Video Exploration) is a participatory design method used to develop graphical user interfaces.

It was developed by Michael Muller at Bellcore around 1990.

The technique has been adapted and extended by other researchers.
