= Human action cycle =

The human action cycle is a psychological model which describes the steps humans take when they interact with computer systems. The model was proposed by Donald A. Norman, a scholar in the discipline of human–computer interaction. The model can be used to help evaluate the efficiency of a user interface (UI). Understanding the cycle requires an understanding of the user interface design principles of affordance, feedback, visibility and tolerance.

The human action cycle describes how humans may form goals and then develop a series of steps required to achieve that goal, using the computer system. The user then executes the steps, thus the model includes both cognitive activities and physical activities.

== The three stages of the human action cycle ==
The model is divided into three stages of seven steps in total, and is (approximately) as follows:

=== Goal formation stage ===
- 1. Goal formation.

=== Execution stage ===
- 2. Translation of goals into a set of unordered tasks required to achieve goals.
- 3. Sequencing the tasks to create the action sequence.
- 4. Executing the action sequence.

=== Evaluation stage ===
- 5. Perceiving the results after having executed the action sequence.
- 6. Interpreting the actual outcomes based on the expected outcomes.
- 7. Comparing what happened with what the user wished to happen.

== Use in evaluation of user interfaces ==
Typically, an evaluator of the user interface will pose a series of questions for each of the cycle's steps, an evaluation of the answer provides useful information about where the user interface may be inadequate or unsuitable. These questions might be:

- Step 1, Forming a goal:
  - Do the users have sufficient domain and task knowledge and sufficient understanding of their work to form goals?
  - Does the UI help the users form these goals?
- Step 2, Translating the goal into a task or a set of tasks:
  - Do the users have sufficient domain and task knowledge and sufficient understanding of their work to formulate the tasks?
  - Does the UI help the users formulate these tasks?
- Step 3, Planning an action sequence:
  - Do the users have sufficient domain and task knowledge and sufficient understanding of their work to formulate the action sequence?
  - Does the UI help the users formulate the action sequence?
- Step 4, Executing the action sequence:
  - Can typical users easily learn and use the UI?
  - Do the actions provided by the system match those required by the users?
  - Are the affordance and visibility of the actions good?
  - Do the users have an accurate mental model of the system?
  - Does the system support the development of an accurate mental model?
- Step 5, Perceiving what happened:
  - Can the users perceive the system's state?
  - Does the UI provide the users with sufficient feedback about the effects of their actions?
- Step 6, Interpreting the outcome according to the users' expectations:
  - Are the users able to make sense of the feedback?
  - Does the UI provide enough feedback for this interpretation?
- Step 7, Evaluating what happened against what was intended:
  - Can the users compare what happened with what they were hoping to achieve?

== Related terms ==
- Gulf of evaluation exists when the user has trouble performing the evaluation stage of the human action cycle (steps 5 to 7).
- Gulf of execution exists when the user has trouble performing the execution stage of the human action cycle (steps 2 to 4).
- OODA Loop is an equivalent in military strategy.
