= Toyota National College of Technology =

- 国立豊田工業高等専門学校
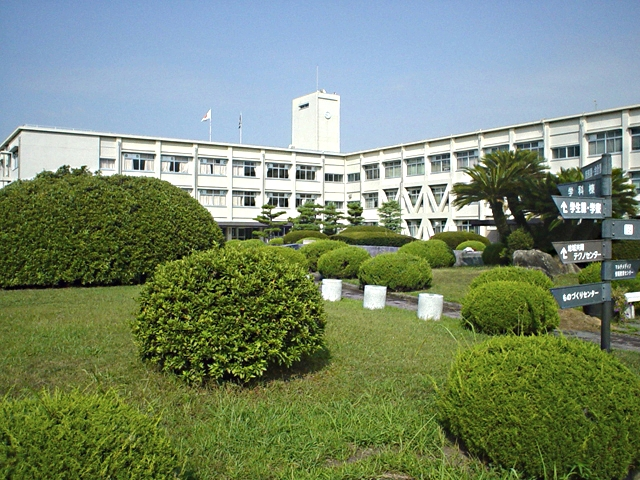
- Toyota National College of Technology
- Type: Public (National)
- Established: 1963
- Administrative staff: 130
- Undergraduates: 1,118
- Location: Toyota, Aichi prefecture, Japan; 35°6′11.8″N 137°8′53.5″E
- Website: www.toyota-ct.ac.jp

Toyota National College of Technology (国立豊田工業高等専門学校, Kokuritsu toyota kougyou koutou senmon gakko) is a Colleges of technology in Japan (Kosen) with a five-year technical curriculum.

The college is signatory to the JABEE (Accreditation System for Engineering Education in Japan) since 2005, which is signatory to the Washington Accord.

== Departments and Advanced Engineering Courses ==
Toyota National College of Technology has five Departments and three Advanced Engineering Courses.

| Department | Faculty |
|---|---|
| Department of Electrical and Electronic Engineering | 1963.04 |
| Department of Mechanical Engineering | 1963.04 |
| Department of Architecture | 1963.04 |
| Department of Civil Engineering | 1968.04 |
| Department of Information and Computer Engineering | 1987.04 |
| Courses of Electronic and Mechanical Engineering | 1994.04 |
| Courses of Civil Engineering and Architecture | 1994.04 |
| Courses of Computer Science | 1994.04 |

== History ==
1963.04 Toyota National College of Technology was established (Department of Mechanical Engineering, Department of Electrical Engineering, and Department of Architecture).
1968.04 Department of Civil Engineering was added. A boarding system was adopted for students in lower grades.
1979.03 Data Station was opened.
1983.06 Strength Test Center for Materials and Structure was established.
1987.04 Department of Information and Computer Engineering was added.
1993.04 The Reorganization of Department of Civil Engineering.
1994.04 Advanced Engineering Courses were established. Courses of Electronic and Mechanical Engineering, Civil Engineering and Architecture, Computer Science were established.
1996.07 Data Station was reorganized into Multimedia Center for Information Processing.
1999.04 Department of Electrical Engineering was renamed Department of Electrical and Electronic Engineering.
2002.10 Collaboration Research Center of Technology was established.
2004.04 Techno-training Center for Manufacturing ("Monodukuri" Center) was established.

== School Clubs and Interest Groups ==
At Toyota National College of Technology, clubs and interest groups operate primarily under the Student Council, serving as venues for students to learn from and improve alongside one another.

=== Culture Clubs ===
- Wind Ensemble Club
- Photography Club
- Automotive Club
- Interact Club
- Light Music Club
- Computer Club
- Go and Shogi Club
- Tea Ceremony Club
- Drama Club
- Space Design Research Department
- Juggling Club
- General Creative Club

=== Athletic Teams ===
- Track and Field Team
- Swimming Team
- Baseball Team
- Rugby Football Team
- Badminton Team
- Tennis Team
- Soft Tennis Team
- Table Tennis Club
- Soccer Club
- Basketball Team
- Women's Basketball Team
- Volleyball Team
- Women's Volleyball Team
- Handball Team
- Judo Team
- Kendo Team
- Japanese Archery Club
- Mountaineering Club
- Karate Team

=== School Interest Groups ===
- Mechanical Ingenuity Club
- Astronomy Club
- Comprehensive Aviation Technology Research Club
- Railway and Aviation Research Club

=== School Clubs and Interest Groups from the Past ===
- Ski Team
- Orienteering Club
- Broadcasting Research Club
- Newspaper ClubDebate Club
- Dance Club
- Gymnastics Club
