= Susan Weinschenk =

American behavioral psychologist (born 1953)

- Born: December 24, 1953 (age 72); Syracuse, New York, USA
- Occupations: Author; consultant
- Known for: User Experience, behaviorism

Susan Weinschenk (born December 24, 1953) is an American behavioral psychologist who has been working in the field of design and user experience since 1985. She has published five books on user experience in computer systems and has spoken at many conferences She also is the founder of the Weinschenk Institute.

== Bibliography ==
- Weinschenk, Susan. How To Get People To Do Stuff Berkeley, CA: New Riders, 2013. London : Pearson Education
- Weinschenk, Susan. 100 Things Every Designer Needs To Know About People Berkeley, CA: New Riders, 2011. London : Pearson Education
- Weinschenk, Susan. Neuro Web Design: What Makes Them Click? Berkeley, CA: New Riders, 2009. ISBN 9780321603609
- Weinschenk, Susan, and Dean T. Barker. Designing Effective Speech Interfaces. New York: Wiley, 2000.
- Weinschenk, Susan, Pamela Jamar, and Sarah C. Yeo. GUI Design Essentials. New York: Wiley Computer Pub, 1997.
- Weinschenk, Susan, and Sarah C. Yeo. Guidelines for Enterprise-Wide GUI Design. New York: Wiley, 1995. <
