= Bernhard Preim =

Bernhard Preim (born 1969) is a specialist in human–computer interface design as well as in visual computing for medicine. He is currently professor of visualization at University of Magdeburg, Germany.

Preim received the diploma in computer science in 1994 (minor in mathematics) and a PhD in 1998 from the Otto-von-Guericke University Magdeburg (PhD thesis "Interactive Illustrations and Animations for the Exploration of Spatial Relations", supervised by Thomas Strothotte). In 1999, he joined the staff of MeVis (Center for Medical Diagnosis System and Visualization, headed by Heinz-Otto Peitgen). In close collaboration with radiologists and surgeons, he directed the work on "computer-aided planning in liver surgery" and initiated several projects funded by the German Research Council in the area of computer-aided surgery. In June 2002, he received the Habilitation degree (venia legendi) for computer science from the University of Bremen. Since Mars 2003 he is full professor for "Visualization" at the computer science department at the Otto-von-Guericke-University of Magdeburg, heading a research group which is focussed on medical visualization and applications in surgical education and surgery planning. These developments are summarized in a comprehensive textbook Visualization in Medicine (Co-author Dirk Bartz), which appeared at Morgan Kaufmann in June 2007. Bernhard Preim was founding speaker of the working group Medical Visualization in the German Society for Computer Science (2003–2012). He is the chair of the scientific advisory board of ICCAS and since 2013 president of the CURAC (German Society for Computer- and Roboter-assisted Surgery, ) and Visiting Professor at the University of Bremen where he closely collaborates with MeVis Research (now Fraunhofer MEVIS). Together with Charl Botha, TU Delft, he founded the VCBM Eurographics workshop series.

== Books ==
- Visual Computing for Medicine, Bernhard Preim and Charl Botha, 2013, San Francisco: Morgan Kaufmann.
- Interaktive Systeme, Bernhard Preim and Raimund Dachselt 2010, Berlin: Springer.
- Visualization in Medicine, Bernhard Preim and Dirk Bartz, 2007, San Francisco: Morgan Kaufmann.
- Entwicklung interaktiver Systeme: Grundlagen, Fallbeispiele und innovative Anwendungsfelder, Bernhard Preim, 1999, Berlin: Springer.
- Interaktive Illustrationen und Animationen zur Erklarung komplexer raumlicher Zusammenhange, Bernhard Preim, 1998, Düsseldorf: VDI Verlag.

== Selected papers ==
- How to Render Frames and Influence People, Thomas Strothotte, Bernhard Preim, Andreas Raab, Jutta Schumann, David R. Forsey, In: Computer Graphics Forum (13) 3, Proceedings of euroGraphics 1994, pp. 455–466, 1994.
- Coherent zooming of illustrations with 3D-graphics and text, Bernhard Preim, Andreas Raab, Thomas Strothotte, Proceedings of the conference on Graphics interface '97, ISBN 0-9695338-6-1, Canadian Information Processing Society.
- Visualization and Interaction Techniques for the Exploration of Vascular Structures. Horst K. Hahn, Bernhard Preim, Dirk Selle, Heinz-Otto Peitgen, IEEE Visualization'2001.
- Analysis of vasculature for liver surgical planning, Selle, D., Preim, B., Schenk, A., Peitgen, H.-O., IEEE Transactions on Medical Imaging, Nov 2002, Volume: 21, Issue: 11, pp 1344–1357, ISSN 0278-0062.
- Integration of Measurement Tools in Medical 3d Visualizations. Bernhard Preim, Christian Tietjen, Wolf Spindler, Heinz-Otto Peitgen. IEEE Visualization'2002.
- Visualization of Vascular Structures: Method, Validation and Evaluation. Steffen Oeltze and Bernhard Preim, IEEE Transactions on Medical Imaging, 24(4), April 2005, pp. 540–549
- Combining Silhouettes, Surface, and Volume Rendering for Surgery Education and Planning, Christian Tietjen, Tobias Isenberg, Bernhard Preim. EuroVis'2005. pp. 303~310
- Real-Time Illustration of Vascular Structures for Surgery, Felix Ritter, Christian Hansen, Bernhard Preim, Volker Dicken, and Olaf Konrad-Verse. IEEE Transactions on Visualization, 12:877–884, 2006
- Viewpoint Selection for Intervention Planning, Konrad Mühler, Mathias Neugebauer, Christian Tietjen, Bernhard Preim, EuroVis'2007. pp. 267–274
