= Mobile interaction =

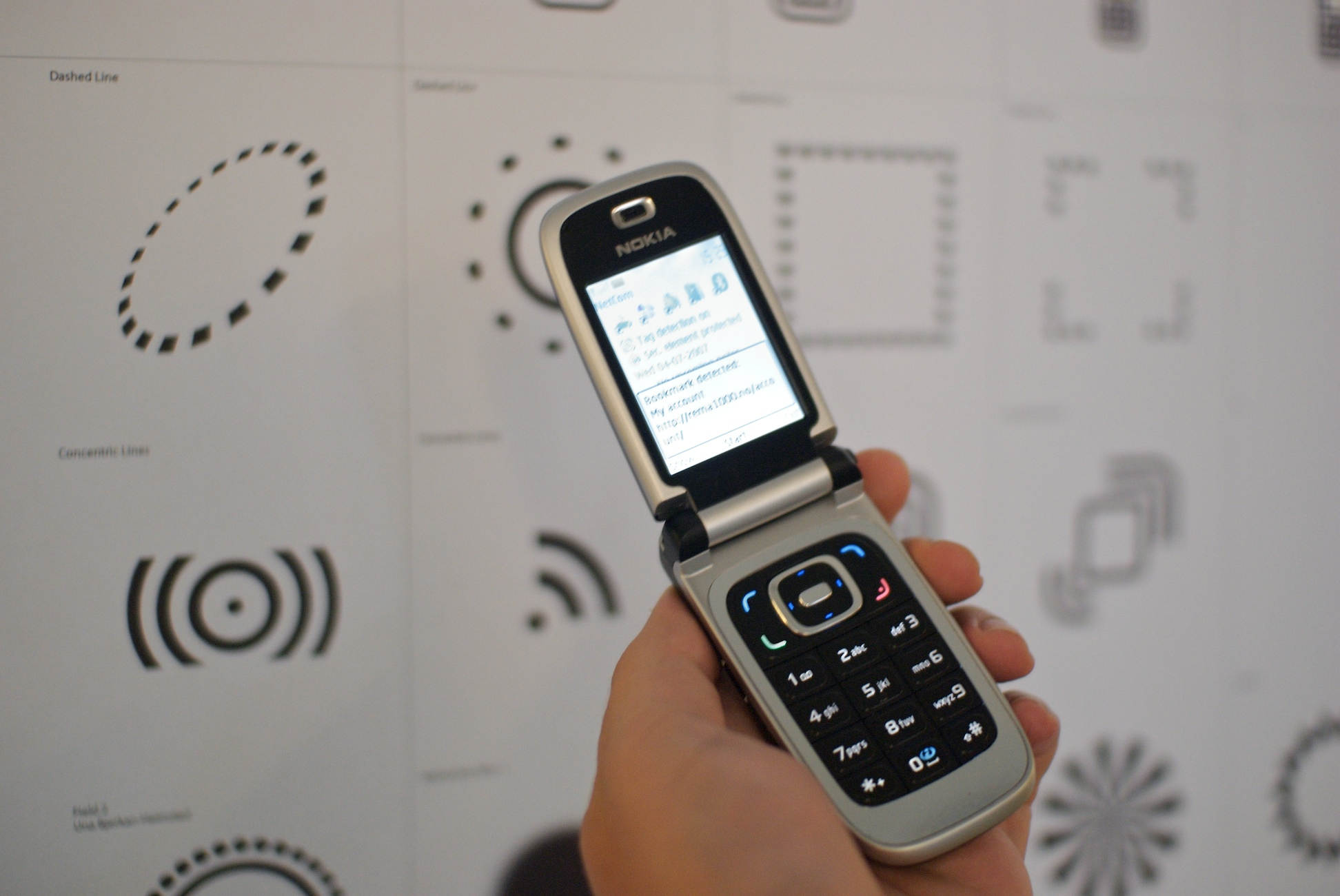
Mobile phone device

Mobile interaction is the study of interaction between mobile users and computers. Mobile interaction is an aspect of human–computer interaction that emerged when computers became small enough to enable mobile usage, around the 1990s.

Mobile devices are a pervasive part of people's everyday lives, with people using mobile phones, PDAs, and portable media players almost everywhere. These devices are the first pervasive interaction devices that are currently used for a huge variety of services and applications. Mobile devices affect the way people interact, share, and communicate with others. They are growing in diversity and complexity, featuring new interaction paradigms, modalities, shapes, and purposes (e.g., e-readers, portable media players, handheld game consoles). The strong differentiating factors that characterize mobile devices from traditional personal computing (e.g., desktop computers), are their ubiquitous use, usual small size, and mixed interaction modalities.

The history of mobile interaction includes different design trends. The main six design trends are portability, miniaturization, connectivity, convergence, divergence, and application software (apps). The main reason behind those trends is to understand the requirements and needs of mobile users which is the main goal for mobile interaction. Mobile interaction is a multidisciplinary area with various academic subjects making contributions to it. The main disciplines involved in mobile interaction are psychology, computer science, sociology, design, and information systems. The processes in mobile interaction design includes three main activities: understanding users, developing prototype designs, and evaluation.

== History ==
The history of mobile interaction can be divided into a number of eras, or waves, each characterized by a particular technological focus, interaction design trends, and by leading to fundamental changes in the design and use of mobile devices. Although not strictly sequential, they provide a good overview of the legacy on which current mobile computing research and design is built.

1. Portability
  One of the first works in the mobile interaction discipline was the concept of the Dynabook by Alan Kay in 1968. However, at that time the necessary hardware to build such system was not available. When the first laptops were built in the early 1980s, they were seen as transportable desktop computers.
2. Miniaturization
  By the early 1990s, many types of handheld devices were introduced such as labelled palmtop computers, digital organizers, or personal digital assistants (PDAs).
3. Connectivity
  By 1973, Martin Cooper worked at Motorola developed a handheld mobile phone concept, which later on by 1983, led to the introduction of the first commercial mobile phone called the DynaTAC 8000X.

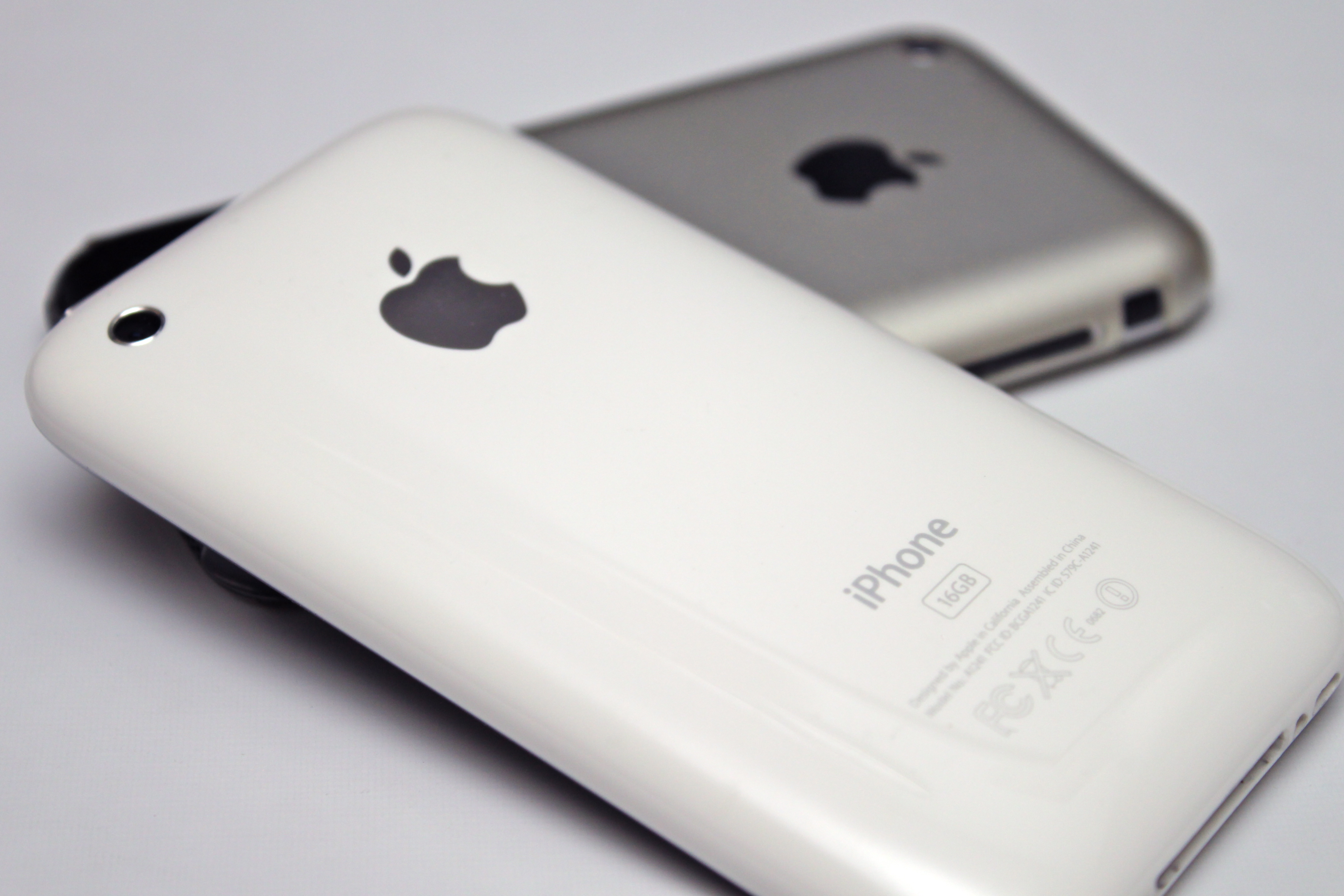
iPhone 2G and iPhone 3G

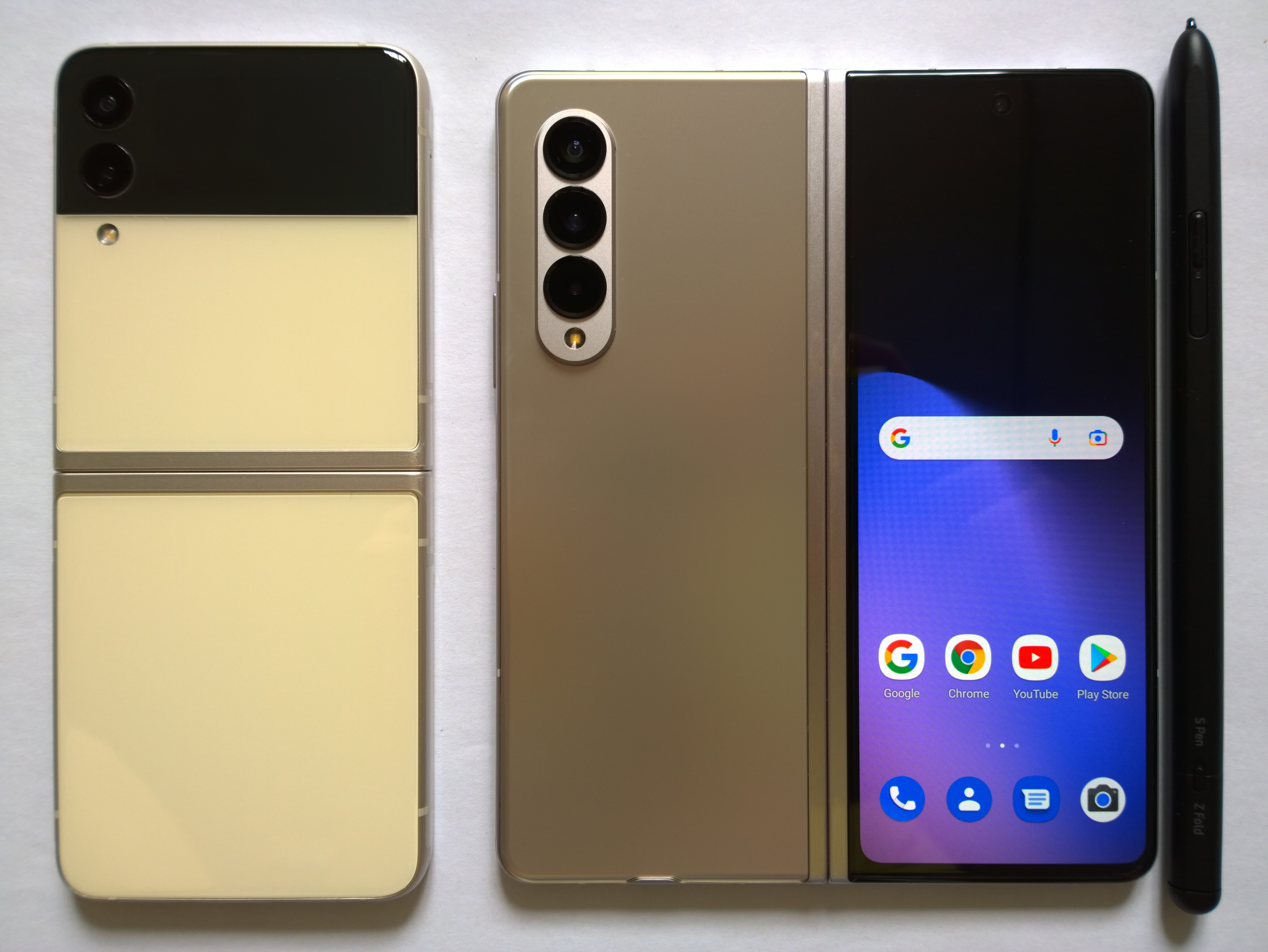
Android smartphones

1. Convergence
  During this era, different types of specialized mobile devices started to converge into new types of hybrid devices with primarily different form factors and interaction designs. On 1992, the first device of such technique, the "smartphones" was introduced. The first smart phone was the IBM Simon and it was used for making phone calls, calendars, addresses, notes, e-mail, fax and games.
2. Divergence
  During the 2000s, a trend toward a single function many devices started to spread. the basic idea behind divergence is that specialized tools facilitate optimization of functionality over time and enhancement of use. One of the most famous devices of this era was the Apple iPod on 2001.
3. Apps
  During 2007, Apple Inc. introduced the first truly "smart" cellular phone; the iPhone. It was a converged mobile device with different features functionality. The most important thing is that it represents a significant rethinking of the design of mobile interactions and a series of notable interaction design choices. In less than a decade Apple Inc. would sell over one-billion iPhones

== Goals ==
With the evolution of both software and hardware on the mobile devices, the users are becoming more demanding of the user interface that provide both functionality and pleasant user experience. The goal of mobile interaction researches is to understand the requirements and needs of mobile users. Compared with stationary devices mobile devices have specific, often restricted, input and output requirements. A goal that is often named is to overcome the limitations of mobile devices. However, exploiting the special opportunities of mobile usage can also be seen as a central goal.

== Disciplines involved ==
Mobile interaction is a multidisciplinary area with various academic subjects making contributions. This is a reflection of the complicated nature of an individual's interaction with a computer system. This includes factors such as an understanding of the user and the task the user wants to perform with the system, understanding of the design tools, software packages that are needed to achieve this and an understanding of software engineering tools. The following are the main disciplines involved in mobile interaction:

=== Psychology ===
Many of the research methods and system evaluation techniques currently used in mobile human-computer interaction research are borrowed from psychology. As well as attitude measures, performance measures that are used in mobile human-computer interaction research studies come from the area of experimental psychology. Understanding users and their needs is a key aspect in the design of mobile systems, devices, and applications so that they will be easy and enjoyable to use. Individual user characteristics such as age, or personality physical disabilities such as blindness, all have an effect on users' performance when they are using mobile applications and systems, and these individual differences can also affect people's attitude towards the mobile service or device that they interact with. A study from 2020, for example, found that smartphone users initiated 89% of the interactions with their phones, with only 11% of the interactions resulting from a notification.

=== Computer science ===
Computer science (along with software engineering) is responsible for providing software tools to develop the interfaces that users need to interact with system. These include the software development tools.

=== Sociology ===
Sociologists working in this area are responsible for looking at socio-technical aspects of human-computer interaction. They bring methods and techniques from the social sciences (e.g., observational studies, ethnography) that can be used in the design and evaluation of mobile devices and applications.

=== Design ===
People working in this area are concerned with looking at the design layout of the interface (e.g., colors, positioning of text or graphics on a screen of a PDA). This is a crucial area of mobile human-computer interaction research due to the limited screen space available for most mobile devices. Therefore, it is crucial that services and applications reflect this limitation by reducing information complexity to fit the parameters of the mobile device, without losing any substantial content.

=== Information systems ===
People who work in information systems are interested in investigating how people interact with information and technologies in an organisational, managerial, and business context. In an organisational context, information system professionals and researchers are interested in looking at ways in which mobile technologies and mobile applications can be used to make an organisation more effective in conducting its business on a day-to-day business.

== Mobile interaction design ==
Mobile interaction design is part of the interaction design which heavily focused on satisfying the needs and desires of the majority of people who will use the product. The processes in mobile interaction design are in the following main types of activity:

1. Understanding users – having a sense of people's capabilities and limitations; gaining a rich picture of what makes up the detail of their lives, the things they do and use.
2. Developing prototype designs – representing a proposed interaction design in such a way that it can be demonstrated, altered, and discussed.
3. Evaluation – each prototype is a stepping stone to the next, better, refined design. Evaluation techniques identify the strengths and weaknesses of a design but can also lead the team to propose a completely different approach, discarding the current line of design thinking for a radical approach.

== See also ==
- Augmented reality – Form of 3D computer interaction merging the real world with virtual objects
- Human factors and ergonomics
- Human–computer interaction
- Interaction design – Specialization of design focused on the experience users have of a product or service
- Mobile computing – Using devices designed to be portable
- Ubiquitous computing – Concept in software engineering and computer science
- User-centered design – Framework of processes with focus on users, uses, and tasks
