= Progressive disclosure =

Concept in interaction design

Progressive disclosure is an interaction design pattern used to make applications easier to learn and less error-prone. It does so by deferring some advanced or rarely-used features to a secondary screen and designing workflows where information is revealed when it becomes relevant to the current task.

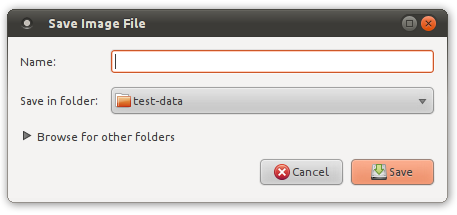
Disclosure widget ("Browse for...") in the GTK+ file dialog.

A classic example of this pattern is the print dialog in macOS. While printing a page, the print dialog shows only a small subset of choices. If the user wants more advanced options, they can click the "Show Details" button to reveal these features in a secondary screen.

In the physical world, progressive disclosure is used by modern theme park designers. Long waiting lines for rides can scare away visitors, so only a small segment of the line is made visible from any vantage point. As people move ahead in line, they only get to see discrete portions of the entire line. This design can make waiting more bearable for those in line.

== History ==
Kristina Hooper Woolsey, a founding member of the Apple Human Interface Group, wrote in 1985 what could be considered as the seminal idea for selectively disclosing to new users how a system works:

"In the design of interfaces one must also consider carefully how one selectively informs a user about a particular system, providing well-chosen bits and pieces that can constitute a general understanding of a system."

== See also ==
- Disclosure widget
- Chunking (writing)
