= Mobile application testing =

Method for testing mobile applications

Mobile application testing is a process by which application software developed for handheld mobile devices is tested for its functionality, usability and consistency. Mobile application testing can be an automated or manual type of testing. Mobile applications either come pre-installed or can be installed from mobile software distribution platforms. Global mobile app revenues totaled 69.7 billion USD in 2015, and are predicted to account for US$188.9 billion by 2020.

Bluetooth, GPS, sensors, and Wi-Fi are some of the core technologies at play in wearables. Mobile application testing accordingly focuses on field testing, user focus, and looking at areas where hardware and software need to be tested in unison.

== Key challenges for mobile application testing ==
- Must be downloadable: The application must be obtainable for the particular platform, generally from an app store.
- Diversity in mobile platforms/OSes:There are different mobile operating systems in the market. The major ones are Android, iOS, and Windows Phone. Each operating system has its own limitations.
- Device availability: Access to the right set of devices when there is an ever-growing list of devices and operating system versions is a constant mobile application testing challenge. Access to devices can become even more challenging if testers are spread across different locations.
- Mobile network operators: There are over 400 mobile network operators in the world; some are CDMA, some GSM, and others use less common network standards like FOMA, and TD-SCDMA.
- Scripting: The variety of devices makes executing a test script (scripting) a key challenge. As devices differ in keystrokes, input methods, menu structure and display properties, a single script does not function on every device.
- Test method: There are two main ways of testing mobile applications: testing on real devices or testing on emulators. Emulators often miss issues that can only be caught by testing on real devices, but because of the multitude of different devices in the market, real devices can be expensive to purchase and time-consuming to use for testing.
- Compatibility: It is necessary to test the compatibility; ensuring that the application works consistently even with different device properties, such as different screen sizes and resolutions.
- Should be able to pick up the phone: While executing the app application should be able to pick up a call.
- Variety of mobile devices: Mobile devices differ in screen input methods (QWERTY, touch, normal) with different hardware capabilities.
- Lack of capacity for users' scenarios creation. While conducting performance testing of mobile application, the engineers usually lack sufficient hardware to perform proper load testing.

== Types of mobile application testing ==
- Functional testing ensures that the application is working as per the requirements. Most of the tests conducted for this is driven by the user interface and call flow.
- Laboratory testing, usually carried out by network carriers, is done by simulating the complete wireless network. This test is performed to find out any glitches when a mobile application uses voice and/or data connection to perform some functions.
- Performance testing is undertaken to check the performance and behavior of the application under certain conditions such as low battery, bad network coverage, low available memory, simultaneous access to the application's server by several users and other conditions. Performance of an application can be affected from two sides: the application's server side and client's side. Performance testing is carried out to check both.
- Memory leakage testing: Memory leakage happens when a computer program or application is unable to manage the memory it is allocated resulting in poor performance of the application and the overall slowdown of the system. As mobile devices have significant constraints of available memory, memory leakage testing is crucial for the proper functioning of an application
- Interrupt testing: An application while functioning may face several interruptions like incoming calls or network coverage outage and recovery. The different types of interruptions are:

- Incoming and outgoing SMS and MMS
- Incoming and outgoing calls
- Incoming notifications
- Battery removal
- Cable insertion and removal for data transfer
- Network outage and recovery
- Media player on/off
- Device power cycle

An application should be able to handle these interruptions by going into a suspended state and resuming afterwards.

- Usability testing is carried out to verify if the application is achieving its goals and getting a favorable response from users. This is important as the usability of an application is its key to commercial success (it is nothing but user friendliness). Another important part of usability testing is to make sure that the user experience is uniform across all devices. This section of testing hopes to address the key challenges of the variety of mobile devices and the diversity in mobile platforms/OS, which is also called device fragmentation. One key portion of this type of usability testing is to be sure that there are no major errors in the functionality, placement, or sizing of the user interface on different devices.
- Installation testing: Certain mobile applications come pre-installed on the device whereas others have to be installed by the store. Installation testing verifies that the installation process goes smoothly without the user having to face any difficulty. This testing process covers installation, updating and uninstalling of an application
- Certification testing: To get a certificate of compliance, each mobile device needs to be tested against the guidelines set by different mobile platforms.
- Security testing: Checks vulnerabilities to hacking, authentication and authorization policies, data security, session management and other security standards.
- Location testing: Connectivity changes with network and location, but you can't mimic those fluctuating conditions in a lab. Only in Country non-automated testers can perform comprehensive usability and functionality testing.
- Outdated software testing: Not everyone regularly updates their operating system. Some Android users might not even have access to the newest version. Professional testers can test outdated software.
- Load testing: When many users all attempt to download, load, and use an app or game simultaneously, slow load times or crashes can occur causing many customers to abandon your app, game, or website. In-country human testing done manually is the most effective way to test load.
- Black-box testing: Where the application is tested without looking at the applications code and logic. The tester has specific test data to input and the corresponding output that the application should produce, and inputs the test data looking for the program to output data consistent with what the tester was expecting. This method of test can be applied virtually to every level of software testing: unit, integration, system and acceptance.
- Crowdsourced testing: In recent years, crowdsourced testing has become popular as companies can test mobile applications faster and cheaper using a global community of testers. Due to growing diversity of devices and operating systems as well as localization needs, it is difficult to comprehensively test mobile applications with small in-house testing teams. A global community of testers provides easy access to different devices and platforms. A globally distributed team can also test it in multiple locations and under different network conditions. Finally, localization issues can be tested by hiring testers in required geographies. Since real users using real devices test the application, this is more likely to find issues faced by users under real world conditions.
