= Component-based usability testing =

Testing approach within software engineering

Component-based usability testing (CBUT) is a testing approach which aims at empirically testing the usability of an interaction component. The latter is defined as an elementary unit of an interactive system, on which behavior-based evaluation is possible. For this, a component needs to have an independent, and by the user perceivable and controllable state, such as a radio button, a slider or a whole word processor application. The CBUT approach can be regarded as part of component-based software engineering branch of software engineering.

== Theory ==
CBUT is based on both software architectural views such as model–view–controller (MVC), presentation–abstraction–control (PAC), ICON and CNUCE agent models that split up the software in parts, and cognitive psychology views where a person's mental process is split up in smaller mental processes. Both software architecture and cognitive architecture use the principle of hierarchical layering, in which low level processes are more elementary and for humans often more physical in nature, such as the coordination movement of muscle groups. Processes that operate on higher level layers are more abstract and focus on a person's main goal, such as writing an application letter to get a job.

The layered protocol theory (LPT), which is a special version of perceptual control theory (PCT), brings these views together by suggesting that users interact with a system across several layers by sending messages. Users interact with components on high layers by sending messages, such as pressing keys, to components operating on lower layers, which on their turn relay a series of these messages into a single high-level message, such as DELETE, to a component on a higher layer. Components operating on higher layers, communicate back to the user by sending messages to components operating on lower-level layers. Whereas this layered-interaction model explains how the interaction is established, control loops explain the purpose of the interaction. LPT sees the purpose of the users' behavior as the users' attempt to control their perception, in this case the state of the component they perceive. This means that users will only act if they perceive the component to be in an undesirable state. For example, if a person has an empty glass but want a full glass of water, he or she will act (e.g. walk to the tap, turning the tap on to fill the glass). The action of filling the glass will continue until the person perceives the glass as full. As interaction with components takes places on several layers, interacting with a single device can include several control loops. The amount of effort put into operating a control loop is seen as an indicator for the usability of an interaction component.

== Testing ==
CBUT can be categorized according to two testing paradigms, the single-version testing paradigm (SVTP) and the multiple-versions testing paradigm (MVTP). In SVTP only one version of each interaction component in a system is tested. The focus is to identify interaction components that might reduce the overall usability of the system. SVTP is therefore suitable as part of a software-integration test. In MVTP on the other hand, multiple versions of a single component are tested while the remaining components in the system remain unchanged. The focus is on identifying the version with the highest usability of specific interaction component. MVTP therefore is suitable for component development and selection. Different CBUT methods have been proposed for SVTP and MVTP, which include measures based on recorded user interaction and questionnaires. Whereas in MVTP the recorded data can directly be interpreted by making a comparison between two versions of the interaction component, in SVTP log file analysis is more extensive as interaction with both higher and lower components must be considered. Meta-analysis on the data from several lab experiments that used CBUT measures suggests that these measures can be statistically more powerful than overall (holistic) usability measures.

== Usability questionnaire ==
While holistic oriented usability questionnaires such as the system usability scale (SUS) examine the usability of a system on several dimensions such as defined in ISO 9241 Part 11 standard effectiveness, efficiency and satisfaction, a component-based usability questionnaire (CBUQ) is a questionnaire which can be used to evaluate the usability of individual interaction components, such as the volume control or the play control of a MP3 player. To evaluate an interaction component, the six perceived ease-of-use (PEOU) statements from the technology acceptance model are taken with a reference to the interaction component, instead of to the entire system.

Users are asked to rate these statements on a seven-point Likert scale. The average rating on these six statements is regarded as the user's usability rating of the interaction component. Based on lab studies with difficult to use interaction components and easy to use interaction components, a break-even point of 5.29 on seven-point Likert scale has been determined. Using a one-sample student's t-test, it is possible to examine whether users' rating of an interaction component deviates from this break-even point. Interaction components that receive rating below this break-even point can be regarded as more comparable to the set of difficult to use interaction components, whereas ratings above this break-even point would be more comparable to the set of easy-to-use interaction components.

If engineers like to evaluate multiple interaction components simultaneously, the CBUQ questionnaire exists of separate sections, one for each interaction component, each with their own 6 PEOU statements.

== See also ==
- Cognitive ergonomics
- Human–computer interaction
- Usability engineering
- Usability testing
