= Joanna McGrenere =

Canadian computer scientist

Academic background
- Education: University of Western Ontario (BS); University of British Columbia (MS); University of Toronto (PhD)
- Thesis: The Design and Evaluation of Multiple Interfaces: A Solution for Complex Software
- Doctoral advisor: Ronald Baecker

Academic work
- Sub-discipline: Human–computer interaction Adaptive user interfaces Universal usability
- Institutions: University of British Columbia

Joanna McGrenere is a Canadian computer scientist specializing in human–computer interaction, adaptive user interfaces, and universal usability. She is a professor of computer science at the University of British Columbia.

== Education ==
McGrenere earned a Bachelor of Science degree in computer science University of Western Ontario in 1993. She earned a master's degree in 1996 at the University of British Columbia and completing her Ph.D. in 2002 at the University of Toronto. Her dissertation, The Design and Evaluation of Multiple Interfaces: A Solution for Complex Software, was jointly supervised by Ronald Baecker and Kellogg S. Booth.

== Career ==
After earning her bachelor's degree, McGrenere briefly worked at IBM. Upon completing her doctorate, she joined the University of British Columbia as an assistant professor in 2002. She was promoted to full professor in 2013. At the University of British Columbia, her notable doctoral students have included Leah Findlater and Karyn Moffat.

== Awards and honors ==
In 2004, McGrenere became the inaugural winner of the Borg Early Career Award of the Computing Research Association. In 2011, the Canadian Association of Computer Science gave McGrenere their Outstanding Young Computer Science Researcher Award.

McGrenere was elected to the College of New Scholars, Artists and Scientists of the Royal Society of Canada in 2017. In 2024, she was elected an ACM Distinguished Member.
