= Usability engineering =

Academic field

Usability engineering is a professional discipline that focuses on improving the usability of interactive systems. It draws on theories from computer science and psychology to define problems that occur during the use of such a system. Usability Engineering involves the testing of designs at various stages of the development process, with users or with usability experts.

The history of usability engineering in this context dates back to the 1980s. In 1988, authors John Whiteside and John Bennett—of Digital Equipment Corporation and IBM, respectively—published material on the subject, isolating the early setting of goals, iterative evaluation, and prototyping as key activities. The usability expert Jakob Nielsen is a leader in the field of usability engineering. In his 1993 book Usability Engineering, Nielsen describes methods to use throughout a product development process—so designers can ensure they take into account the most important barriers to learnability, efficiency, memorability, error-free use, and subjective satisfaction before implementing the product. Nielsen’s work describes how to perform usability tests and how to use usability heuristics in the usability engineering lifecycle. Ensuring good usability via this process prevents problems in product adoption after release. Rather than focusing on finding solutions for usability problems—which is the focus of a UX or interaction designer—a usability engineer mainly concentrates on the research phase. In this sense, it is not strictly a design role, and many usability engineers have a background in computer science because of this. Despite this point, its connection to the design trade is absolutely crucial, not least as it delivers the framework by which designers can work so as to be sure that their products will connect properly with their target usership.

== International standards ==
Usability engineers sometimes work to shape an interface such that it adheres to accepted operational definitions of user requirements documentation. For example, the International Organization for Standardization approved definitions (see e.g., ISO 9241 part 11) usability are held by some to be a context, efficiency, and satisfaction with which specific users should be able to perform tasks. Advocates of this approach engage in task analysis, then prototype interface design, and usability testing on those designs. On the basis of such tests, the technology is potentially redesigned if necessary.

The US National Institute of Standards and Technology has collaborated with industry to develop the Common Industry Specification for Usability – Requirements, which serves as a guide for many industry professionals. The specifications for successful usability in biometrics were also developed by the NIST. Usability.gov, a no-longer maintained website formerly operated by the US General Services Administration, provided a tutorial and wide general reference for the design of usable websites.

Usability, especially with the goal of universal usability, encompasses the standards and guidelines of design for accessibility. The aim of these guidelines is to facilitate the use of a software application for people with disabilities. Some guidelines for web accessibility are:

1. The Web Accessibility Initiative guidelines.
2. The Section 508 government guidelines applicable to all public-sector websites.
3. The Americans with Disabilities Act (ADA) guidelines for accessibility of state and local government websites.
4. The IBM Guidelines for accessibility of websites.

== Errors ==
In usability engineering, targeting and identifying human errors when interacting with the product of interest are important to the process: if a user is expected to engage with a product, interface, or service in some way, the very introduction of a human in that engagement increases the potential of encountering human error. Error should be reduced as much as possible in order to avoid frustration or injury. There are two main types of human errors, categorized as slips and mistakes. Slips are a very common kind of error involving automatic behaviors (i.e. typos, hitting the wrong menu item). When slips occur, users the correct goal in mind, but execute the wrong action. Mistakes, on the other hand, involve conscious deliberation that results in the incorrect conclusion. When mistakes occur, the user has the wrong goal in mind and thereby executes the wrong action.

Though slips are the more common type of error, they are no less dangerous. A certain type of slip error, a mode error, can be especially dangerous if a user is executing a high-risk task. For instance, if a user is operating a vehicle and does not realize they are in the wrong mode (i.e. reverse), they might step on the gas intending to drive, but instead accelerate into a garage wall or another car. In order to avoid modal errors, designers often employ modeless states in which users do not have to choose a mode at all, or they must execute a continuous action while intending to execute a certain mode (i.e. pressing a key continuously in order to activate "lasso" mode in Photoshop).

== Evaluation methods ==
Usability engineers conduct usability evaluations of existing or proposed interfaces and their findings are fed back to the designer for use in design or redesign. Common usability evaluation methods include:

- Card sorting
- Cognitive task analysis
- Cognitive walkthroughs
- Contextual inquiry
- Focus groups
- Heuristic evaluations
- Interviews
- Questionnaires
- RITE method
- Surveys
- Think aloud protocol
- Usability testing

== Software applications and development tools ==
There are a variety of online resources that make the job of a usability engineer easier. Online tools do not substitute for a complete usability engineering analysis. Some examples of these include:

=== The Web Metrics Tool Suite ===
This is a product of the US National Institute of Standards and Technology. This toolkit is focused on evaluating the HTML of a website versus a wide range of usability guidelines and includes:

- Web Static Analyzer Tool (WebSAT) – checks web page HTML against typical usability guidelines
- Web Category Analysis Tool (WebCAT) – lets the usability engineer construct and conduct a web category analysis
- Web Variable Instrumenter Program (WebVIP) – instruments a website to capture a log of user interaction
- Framework for Logging Usability Data (FLUD) – a file format and parser for representation of user interaction logs
- FLUDViz Tool – produces a 2D visualization of a single user session
- VisVIP Tool – produces a 3D visualization of user navigation paths through a website
- TreeDec – adds navigation aids to the pages of a website

=== The Usability Testing Environment (UTE) ===
This tool, produced by Mind Design Systems, is available freely to federal government employees. The tool consists of two tightly-integrated applications. The first is the UTE Manager, which helps a tester set up test scenarios (tasks) as well as survey and demographic questions. The UTE Manager also compiles the test results and produces customized reports and summary data, which can be used as quantitative measures of usability observations and recommendations.

The second UTE application is the UTE Runner. The UTE Runner presents the test participants with the test scenarios (tasks) as well as any demographic and survey questions. In addition, the UTE Runner tracks the actions of the subject throughout the test including clicks, keystrokes, and scrolling.

=== The UsableNet Liftmachine ===
This tool is a product of UsableNet.com and implements the section 508 Usability and Accessibility guidelines as well as the W3C Web Accessibility Initiative Guidelines.

== Notable practitioners ==
1. Deborah Mayhew
2. Donald Norman
3. Alan Cooper
4. Jakob Nielsen
5. John M. Carroll
6. Larry Constantine
7. Mary Beth Rossen
8. Steve Krug

== Bibliography ==
1. Nielsen, Jakob (1993). Usability engineering (2nd ed.). Boston: AP Professional. ISBN 0-12-518405-0.
2. Carroll, John M. (2000). Making use : scenario-based design of human–computer interactions. Cambridge, Mass.: MIT Press. ISBN 0-262-03279-1.
3. Rosson, Mary Beth; John Millar Carroll (2002). Usability Engineering: Scenario-Based Development of Human-Computer Interaction. Morgan Kaufmann. ISBN 1-55860-712-9.
4. Nielsen, Jakob (1993). Usability engineering. Morgan Kaufmann. ISBN 978-0-12-518406-9.
5. Spool, Jared; Tara Scanlon; Carolyn Snyder; Terri DeAngelo (1998). Web Site Usability: A Designer's Guide. Morgan Kaufmann. ISBN 978-1-55860-569-5.
6. Mayhew, Deborah (1999). The Usability Engineering Lifecycle: A Practitioner's Handbook. Morgan Kaufmann. ISBN 978-1-55860-561-9.
7. Faulkner, Xristine (2000). Usability Engineering. Palgrave. ISBN 978-0-333-77321-5.
8. Smith, Michael J. (2001). Usability Evaluation and Interface Design: Cognitive Engineering, Intelligent Agents, and Virtual Reality, Volume 1 (Human Factors and Ergonomics). CRC Press. ISBN 978-0-8058-3607-3.
9. Rosson, Mary Beth; John Millar Carroll (2002). Usability Engineering: Scenario-Based Development of Human-Computer Interaction. Morgan Kaufmann.
10. Jacko, Julie (2012). Human-Computer Interaction Handbook: Fundamentals, Evolving Technologies, and Emerging Applications. CRC Press. ISBN 978-1-4398-2943-1.
11. Leventhal, Laura (2007). Usability Engineering: Process, Products & Examples. Prentice Hall. ISBN 978-0-13-157008-5.
12. Sears, Andrew; Julie A. Jacko (2007). The Human-Computer Interaction Handbook: Fundamentals, Evolving Technologies and Emerging Applications. CRC Press. ISBN 978-0-8058-5870-9.
