= Usability lab =

Site of usability testing

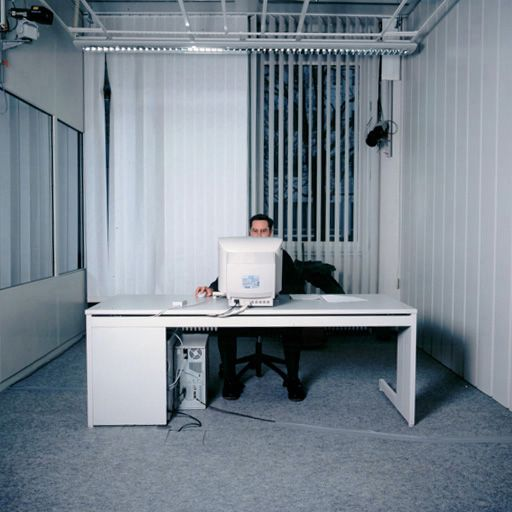
A user inside a usability lab in a white environment

A usability lab is a place where usability testing is done. It is an environment where users are studied interacting with a system for the sake of evaluating the system's usability.

Depending on the kind of system that is evaluated, the user sits in front of a personal computer or stands in front of the systems interface, alongside a facilitator who gives the user tasks to perform. Behind a one-way mirror, a number of observers watch the interaction, make notes, and ensure the activity is recorded. Very often the testing and the observing room are not placed alongside. In this case the video and audio observation are transmitted through a (wireless) network and broadcast via a video monitor or video beamer and loudspeakers. Usually, sessions will be filmed and the software will log interaction details.

A modern alternative is online user testing via video and screen recording. When user testing online and in-person are not feasible, for example because long-term user testing feedback is required and recruitment for repeated sessions poses a barrier, user journaling is an alternative method for collecting user test data.

== Benefits of usability testing ==
Usability is defined by how effectively users can use a product, a brochure, application, website, software package, or video game to achieve their goals. Usability testing is a practice used within the field of user-centered design and user experience that allows for the designers to interact with the users directly about the product to make any necessary modifications to the prototype of the product, whether it be software, a device, or a website. The purpose of the practice is to discover any missed requirements or any kind of development that was seen to be intuitive but ended up confusing new users. By testing user needs and how they interact with the product, designers are able to assess on the product's capacity to meet its intended purpose.

Usability labs help optimize UI designs, work flows, understanding the voice of the customers, and understanding what customers really do. Through in-lab sessions at a specified location, designers, stakeholders and anyone else involved in the project, are observing the process of how a customer interacts with the current prototype. To understand user needs, engineers must observe people while they are actually using computer systems and collect data from on system usability. In-lab usability testing usually has small and specific sample sizes to better obtain qualitative data on the product. The participants cooperate with engineers to understand how the user interacts with the system being tested through hands-on testing.

"Through this process, developers are able to identify issues with the product. To aid fixing any problems, observers pay strict attention to:

- Learn if participants are able to complete specified tasks successfully
- Identify how long it takes to complete specified tasks
- Find out how satisfied participants are with your Web site or other product
- Identify changes required to improve user performance and satisfaction
- Analyze the performance to see if it meets your usability objectives"

== Usability and user experience ==
User experience is important to customer response in the market. The causes of failed designs and ad design decisions can usually be attributed to a lack of information. A poor user experience can ruin a product launch, drive users away for good and impact the reputation of a company.

== Lab-based testing environment ==
Usability tests are both formal and informal attempts to gather data about how users experience interfaces (Angelo), devices, software, sites, and many more. Usability tests have a wide range of involvement in other fields of product development.

=== Tools and technology ===
Usability labs usually feature two rooms. One room containing the lab with the system being tested for usability and all the other necessary equipment such as video and audio recording devices or eye motion trackers. Here, the participant is asked to come in and they are provided tasks to complete to test specific ideas of the product, but sometimes are allowed to explore the product by trying what a certain feature does.

=== Audience ===
In formal labs, there is typically a second room with a one-way mirror. Here, the observation room is held that allows stakeholders, designers, developers, and other parties involved in the project to observe and understand that some things they might have found to be intuitive among their team to actually be more complex than the feature had to be.

=== Recruiting participants ===
Choosing participants for lab testing involves consideration. Not just anyone is a suitable participant for the in-lab test. It is vital to recruit participants who are similar to the site users for usability testing. Developers and designers are not the users, so refrain from using internal staff as participants unless the individual has had no involvement in the design or development of the site or product and they represent a target audience. It is also a good idea to compensate participants for taking time out of their schedule to involve their self in a voluntary experiment; however, there are restrictions. For example, federal employees cannot be paid for their time.

The number of users to test is also an important consideration when recruiting participants. Usability tests cost money and resources which is unfortunately very limited, especially with smaller-scaled projects. One effective approach is to consider using five participants. "Zero users give you zero insights." The moment a single user has been observed in a lab setting, insight on the product is immediately gained. Features in the current design need to be redesigned and revisited to essentially fix anything that was not helping users with their experience. However, there is a limit to how many users should be considered because "as you add more and more users, you learn less and less because you will keep seeing the same things again and again."

== What to look for during testing ==
User research is the process of observing and understanding how people interact with different objects in everyday life. These can range anywhere from websites and software products to hardware and other gadgets.

== Different techniques ==
- Think-aloud experiments
- Contextual interviews
- Concurrent probing
- Retrospective probing
- First click testing
- Focus groups
- Individual interviews
- Online surveys
- Task analysis
