= WUD =

WUD may refer to:

- Woke Up Dead, a web series
- World University of Design, in Haryana, India
- World Usability Day
- Wudinna Airport, in South Australia
- Wudu language, spoken in Togo
