= Pcloudy =

Cloud-based mobile application testing platform

pCloudy
- Industry: Enterprise software, mobile application testing
- Founded: 2013
- Headquarters: Dublin, California

Pcloudy, stylized as pCloudy, is a mobile application testing platform on cloud for "next-gen" app testing. It was founded in 2013. It was acquired by Smart Software Testing Solutions Inc., a Dublin, California based company. It provides mobile testing tools, automation testing tools and bot testing on real devices.

== History ==
pCloudy was founded in March 2012.

By 2016, pCloudy was operated by Pcloud Design Labs Pvt Ltd, based in Bangalore, India. In 2016, US-based company Smart Software Testing acquired pCloudy. By 2020, Smart Software Testing Solutions provided "digital validation solutions" through OpKey and pCloudy, both SaaS platforms. Both the platforms, per the Economic Times, focused on "streamlining and improving the software development lifecycle by employing manual and automated testing," with pCloudy focused more on mobile apps.
