= AUI =

AUI may stand for:

- Ethernet's Attachment Unit Interface, a 15-pin D-connector
- aUI, a constructed language
- The ICAO code for Ukraine International Airlines, Ukraine
- The National Rail code for Ardlui railway station, United Kingdom
- Associated Universities, Inc., the corporation that operates the National Radio Astronomy Observatory (NRAO)
- Amiga User International, a monthly magazine dedicated to the Amiga computer
- Al Akhawayn University, a university located in Ifrane, Morocco
- Adaptive user interface
- Audible user interface, for blind people to use digital devices
- Attentive user interface
- Gold monoiodide, chemical formula AuI

== See also ==
- AUIS (disambiguation)
