= Rainbow box =

Data visualization technique

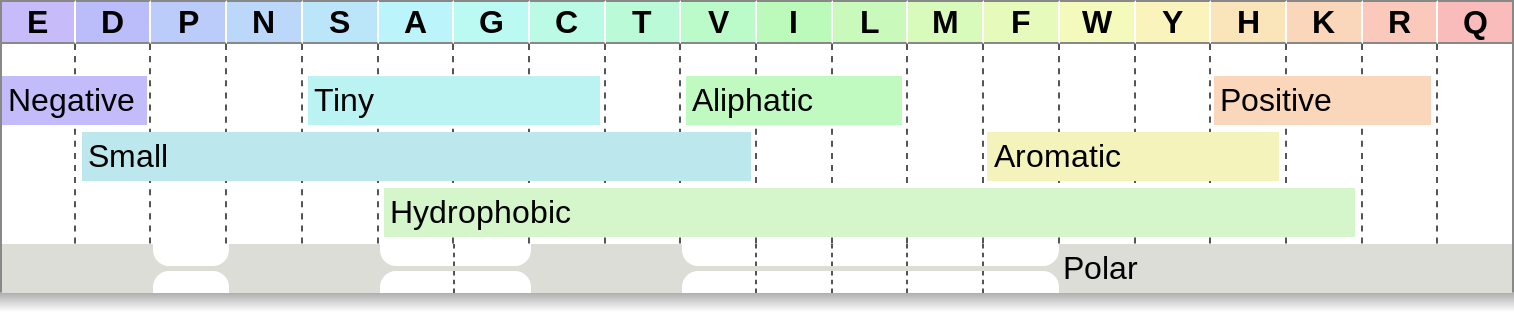
Example of rainbow boxes displaying the 8 properties of the 20 amino acids (from the Taylor's classification)

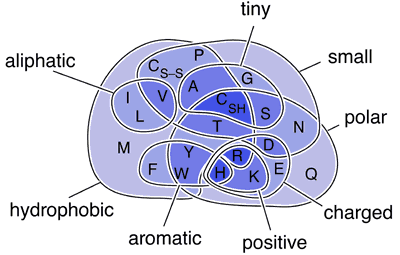
Euler diagram displaying amino acids properties, equivalent to the rainbow boxes above

A rainbow box is a data visualization technique for overlapping sets. Rainbow boxes are an alternative to Euler and Venn diagrams.

The first figure shows rainbow boxes displaying the properties of amino acids. In rainbow boxes, the elements are shown in columns (e.g. the amino acids), and each set is represented by a rectangular box (e.g. the groups of amino acids sharing a given property). Each box covers the columns corresponding to the elements belonging to its set. When the elements of a given set are not displayed in contiguous columns, a “hole” is present in the box of the set (in the amino acids example on the right, the "Polar" box has three holes). The column order is computed using a heuristic optimization algorithm, in order to minimize the number of holes.

A specific color is associated with each column, ranging across the spectrum, and a box's color is the mean of the colors of the columns it covers. Boxes are stacked vertically, the largest boxes being at the bottom. Custom colors may also be defined, depending on the data.

Rainbow boxes were initially presented at the International Conference Information Visualisation (iV) in 2016, and then published in 2017 the Journal of Visual Language and Computing. A user study involving 78 students in biology compared rainbow boxes to Euler diagram for the visualization of amino acids properties. Results showed that rainbow boxes lead to significantly fewer errors and lower response times. A majority of students also preferred rainbow boxes.
