= Deborah J. Mayhew =

Usability educator

- Citizenship: American
- Education: Brown University (BA); University of Denver (MA); Tufts University (PhD)
- Known for: Usability engineering
- Scientific career
- Fields: Usability engineering Human–computer interaction
- Thesis: Syllogistic Reasoning (1981)

Deborah J. Mayhew is an American educator and consultant in the field of software usability, usability engineering, and human–computer interaction. She participated in the founding of SIGCHI and was a volunteer organizer at the first CHI conference in 1983.

== Work ==
Mayhew has published multiple books on usability, including The Usability Engineering Lifecycle. In 1994, Mayhew co-edited Cost-justifying Usability with Randolph Bias, which was included on professor Gerald J. Alred's list of "essential works" on documentation and usability and described as "famous" by SIGCHI.

In 2023, Mayhew received SIGCHI's Lifetime Practice Award.
