= Findlater =

Findlater may refer to:

- Findlater (surname)
- Findlater, Saskatchewan, a village in Canada
- Findlater Castle, a castle in Scotland
- Earl of Findlater, a title in the Peerage of Scotland
- Findlater Stewart (1879–1960), an Anglo-Indian civil servant
