= World Usability Day =

Annual event on second Thursday of November

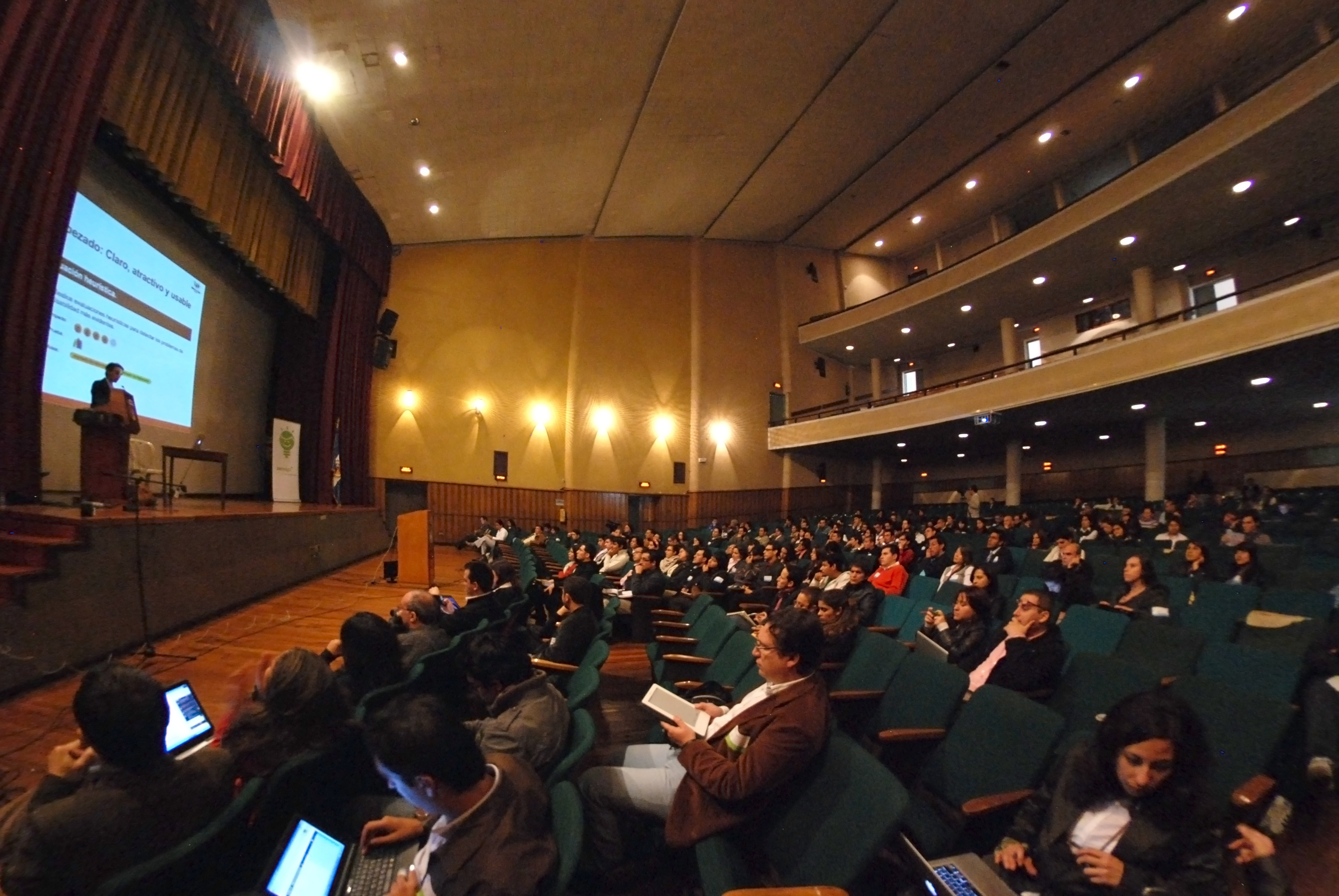
- World Usability Day presentation at La Salle University, Columbia
- Also called: Make Things Easier Day
- Date: Second Thursday in November
- 2024 date: November 14
- 2025 date: November 13
- 2026 date: November 12
- 2027 date: November 11
- Frequency: annual

World Usability Day (WUD) or Make Things Easier Day, Established in 2005 by the Usability Professionals Association (now the User Experience Professionals Association), occurs annually to promote the values of usability, usability engineering, user-centered design, universal usability, and every user's responsibility to ask for things that work better. The day adopts a different theme each year.

World Usability Day started as an idea springing from a discussion in the fall of 2004 between two UPA board members, Elizabeth Rosenzweig and Nigel Bevan. They worked together with the UPA board to start World Usability Day and over the years, Elizabeth Rosenzweig kept it running.

"World Usability Day was established to focus people on the problems and subsequent solutions related to usability. We want to raise people’s awareness of how much these problems impact all of us. If we can get thousands of people on the planet to focus on one thing for one day, we can accomplish something big. It only takes one day to change someone’s point of view, or to light a fire that can burn for years." - Elizabeth Rosenzweig

Across more than 140 countries, WUD has engaged over 250,000 individuals and had an impact on their local communities. WUD has opened up the field of UX and usability in places where it did not exist before the event, such as Eastern Europe (including Poland, Ukraine, Russia, and Turkey).

World Usability Day is currently run by the World Usability Initiative. The WUD organizers have collaborated with renowned professional associations like SIGCHI, HCII, PLAIN, and IFIP. Together, they established the World Usability Initiative (WUI), a focused global organization. Operating as a singular, dedicated entity, WUI works closely with the United Nations, particularly concerning the human factors integral to the 17 Sustainable Development Goals.

Each year, World Usability Day is built around a theme relevant to the state of design and technology. Previous themes include:

- 2024: Designing for a Better World
- 2023: Collaboration and Cooperation
- 2022: Our Health
- 2021: Design of Our Online World
- 2020: Human Centered AI
- 2019: Design for the Future We Want
- 2018: Design for Good or Evil
- 2017: Inclusion
- 2016: Sustainable/Green UX
- 2015: Innovation
- 2014: Engagement
- 2013: Healthcare: Collaborating for Better Systems
- 2012: Finance
- 2011: Education: Designing for Social Change
- 2010: Communication
- 2009: Sustainability
- 2008: Transportation
- 2007: Healthcare
- 2006: Making Life Easy
- 2005: First Year

World Usability Day has support from notable technology leaders including:

- Bill Gates
- Jakob Nielsen
- John Hockenberry

World Usability Day events have been run in over 140 countries, including:

- Canada
- Estonia
- Germany
- Pakistan
- Sweden
- Switzerland
- United Kingdom
- United States

World Usability Day events have been sponsored by numerous corporations and organizations, including:

- American Foundation for the Blind
- University of Washington
- BBVA
- Bentley University
- Optimal Workshop
- Understood
- General Assembly
- HFI
- Priority Pixels
- HeX Productions
- ProCare Software
- WP Engine
- GlobalLogic
- FabricGroup
- Key Lime Interactive
- TPGi
