= AUIS =

AUIS may refer to:

- American University of Integrative Sciences, a private, for-profit medical school located in Bridgetown, Barbados.
- American University of Iraq, Sulaimani

== See also ==
- AUI (disambiguation), for the singular of AUIs
