= Findlater (surname) =

Findlater is a surname. Notable people with the surname include:

- George Findlater (1872–1942), Scottish soldier
- John Findlater (1926–2013), Scottish meteorologist
- Leah Findlater, Canadian and American computer scientist
- Richard Findlater, British journalist and author
- Rick Findlater, makeup artist, known for The Hobbit films
