= Use error =

Alternative to human error

The term use error has recently been introduced to replace the commonly used terms human error and user error. The new term, which has already been adopted by international standards organizations for medical devices (see #Use errors in health care below for references), suggests that accidents should be attributed to the circumstances, rather than to the human beings who happened to be there.

== The need for the terminological change ==
The term "use error" was first used in May 1995 in an MD+DI guest editorial, "The Issue Is 'Use,' Not 'User,' Error", by William Hyman. Traditionally, human errors are considered as a special aspect of human factors. Accordingly, they are attributed to the human operator, or user. When taking this approach, we assume that the system design is perfect, and the only source for the use errors is the human operator. For example, the U.S. Department of Defense (DoD) HFACS classifies use errors attributed to the human operator, disregarding improper design and configuration setting, which often result in missing alarms, or in inappropriate alerting.

The need for changing the term was due to a common malpractice of the stakeholders (the responsible organizations, the authorities, journalists) in cases of accidents. Instead of investing in fixing the error-prone design, management attributed the error to the users. The need for the change has been pointed out by the accident investigators:

- Early in 1983, Erik Hollnagel pointed out that the term Human Error refers to the outcome, not to the cause. A user action is typically classified as an error only if the results are painful
- In the story "Leap of Faith" of his book "Set Phasers on Stun", Steve Casey suggested that the accident of the Indian Airlines Flight 605 near Bangalor in 1990 could have been avoided, should the investigators of the Air France Flight 296 accident of 1988 past the Mulhouse-Habsheim airport considered the circumstances (exceptional situation), rather than the pilots (human errors).
- In his book "Managing the Risks of Organizational Accidents" (Organizational models of accidents) James Reason explained and demonstrated that often, the circumstances for accidents could have been controlled by the responsible organization, and not by the operators.
- In his book "The Field Guide to Understanding Human Errors", Sidney Dekker argued that blaming the operators according to "The Old View" results in defensive behavior of operators, which hampers the efforts to learn from near-misses and from accidents.

== Use errors vs. force majeure ==
A mishap is typically considered as either a use error or a force majeure:

- A use error is a mishap in which a human operator is involved. Typically, such mishaps are attributed to the failure of the human operator
- A force majeure is a mishap that does not involve a human being in the chain of events preceding the event.

== Use errors in health care ==
In 1998, Cook, Woods and Miller presented the concept of hindsight bias, exemplified by celebrated accidents in medicine, by a workgroup on patient safety. The workgroup pointed at the tendency to attribute accidents in health care to isolated human failures. They provide references to early research about the effect of knowledge of the outcome, which was unavailable beforehand, on later judgement about the processes that led up to that outcome. They explain that in looking back, we tend to oversimplify the situation that the actual practitioners faces. They conclude focusing on the hindsight knowledge prevents our understanding of the richer story, the circumstances of the human error.

According to this position, the term Use Error is formally defined in several international standards, such as IEC 62366, ISO 14155 and ISO 14971, to describe

an act or omission of an act that results in a different medical device response than intended by the manufacturer or expected by the user.

ISO standards about medical devices and procedures provide examples of use errors, which are attributed to human factors, include slips, lapses and mistakes. Practically, this means that they are attributed to the user, implying the user's accountability. The U.S. Food and Drug Administration glossary of medical devices provides the following explanation about this term:

"Safe and effective use of a medical device means that users do not make errors that lead to injury and they achieve the desired medical treatment. If safe and effective use is not achieved, use error has occurred. Why and how use error occurs is a human factors concern."

With this interpretation by ISO and the FDA, the term use error is actually synonymous with user error. Another approach, which distinguishes 'use errors' from 'user errors', is taken by IEC 62366. Annex A includes an explanation justifying the new term:

"This International Standard uses the concept of use error. This term was chosen over the more commonly used term of "human error" because not all errors associated with the use of medical device are the result of oversight or carelessness of the part of the user of the medical device. Much more commonly, use errors are the direct result of poor user interface design."

This explanation complies with "The New View", which Sidney Dekker suggested as an alternative to "The Old View". This interpretation favors investigations intended to understand the situation, rather than blaming the operators.

In a 2011 report draft on health IT usability, the U.S. National Institute of Standards and Technology (NIST) defines "use error" in healthcare IT this way: "Use error is a term used very specifically to refer to user interface designs that will engender users to make errors of commission or omission. It is true that users do make errors, but many errors are due not to user error per se but due to designs that are flawed, e.g., poorly written messaging, misuse of color-coding conventions, omission of information, etc.".

=== Example of user error ===
An example of an accident due to a user error is the ecological disaster of 1967 caused by the Torrey Canyon supertanker. The accident was due to a combination of several exceptional events, the result of which was that the supertanker was heading directly to the rocks. At that point, the captain failed to change the course because the steering control lever was inadvertently set to the Control position, which disconnected the rudder from the wheel at the helm.

=== Examples of user failure to handle system failure ===
Examples of the second type are the Three Mile Island accident described above, the NYC blackout following a storm and the chemical plant disaster in Bhopal, India (Bhopal Disaster).

== Classifying use errors ==
The URM Model characterizes use errors in terms of the user's failure to manage a system deficiency. Six categories of use errors are described in a URM document:

1. Expected faults with risky results;
2. Expected faults with unexpected results;
3. Expected user errors in identifying risky situations (this study);
4. User Errors in handling expected faults;
5. Expected errors in function selection;
6. Unexpected faults, due to operating in exceptional states.

== Critics ==
Erik Hollnagel argues that going from and 'old' view to a 'new' view is not enough. One should go all the way to a 'no' view. This means that the notion of error, whether user error or use error might be destructive rather than constructive. Instead, he proposes to focus on the performance variability of everyday actions, on the basis that this performance variability is both useful and necessary. In most cases the result is that things go right, in a few cases that things go wrong. But the reason is the same. Hollnagel expanded on this in his writings about the efficiency–thoroughness trade-off principle of Resilience Engineering, and the Resilient Health Care Net.
