= RITE Method =

RITE Method, for Rapid Iterative Testing and Evaluation, typically referred to as "RITE" testing, is an iterative usability method. It was defined by Michael Medlock, Dennis Wixon, Bill Fulton, Mark Terrano and Ramon Romero. It has been publicly championed by Dennis Wixon while working in the games space for Microsoft.

It has many similarities to "traditional" or "discount" usability testing. The tester and team must define a target population for testing, schedule participants to come into the lab, decide on how the users' behaviors will be measured, construct a test script and have participants engage in a verbal protocol (e.g. think aloud). However it differs from these methods in that it advocates that changes to the user interface are made as soon as a problem is identified and a solution is clear. Sometimes this can occur after observing as few as one participant. Once the data for a participant has been collected the usability engineer and team decide if they will be making any changes to the prototype prior to the next participant. The changed interface is then tested with the remaining users.

The philosophy behind the RITE method is described as: "1) once you find a problem, solve it as soon as you can, and 2) make the decision makers part of the research team." In this way it is a bridge between a strict research method and a design method...and in many ways it represents a participatory design method. Since its official definition and naming its use has rapidly expanded to many other software industries.

== See also ==
- Acceptance testing
- Human–computer interaction
- Human factors
- Interaction design
- Software testing
- Usability
- Usability testing
- User-centered design
