= Crowdsourced testing =

Crowdsourced testing is an emerging trend in software testing which exploits the benefits, effectiveness, and efficiency of crowdsourcing and the cloud platform. It differs from traditional testing methods in that the testing is carried out by a number of different testers from different places, and not by hired consultants and professionals. The software is put to test under diverse realistic platforms which makes it more reliable, cost-effective, and can be fast. In addition, crowdsource testing can allow for remote usability testing because specific target groups can be recruited through the crowd.

This method of testing is considered when the software is more user-centric: i.e., software whose success is determined by its user feedback and which has a diverse user space. It is frequently implemented with gaming, mobile applications, when experts who may be difficult to find in one place are required for specific testing, or when the company lacks the resources or time to carry out the testing internally.

Crowdsourced testing may be considered to be a sub-type of software testing outsourcing.
