= Jakob Nielsen (usability consultant) =

Danish computer scientist (born 1957)

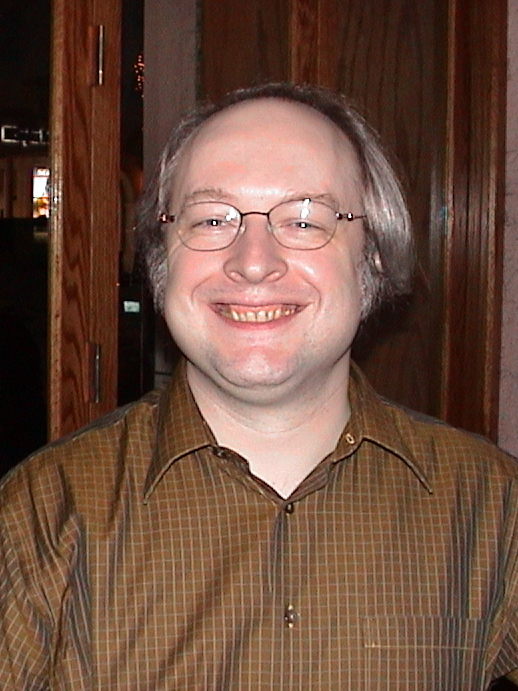
- Nielsen in 2002
- Born: 5 October 1957 (age 69); Copenhagen, Denmark
- Education: Technical University of Denmark (PhD)
- Scientific career
- Fields: Usability; User experience Human–computer interaction
- Workplaces: IBM; Bellcore; Sun Microsystems; Nielsen Norman Group; Thomas J. Watson Research Center
- Thesis: Software Ergonomi (1988)
- Website: www.uxtigers.com

Jakob Nielsen (born 5 October 1957) is a Danish web usability consultant, human–computer interaction researcher, and co-founder of Nielsen Norman Group. He was named the “guru of Web page usability” in 1998 by The New York Times and the “king of usability” by Internet Magazine.

== Education and early life ==
Jakob Nielsen was born 5 October 1957 in Copenhagen, Denmark. He holds a PhD in human–computer interaction from the Technical University of Denmark.

== Career and research ==
Nielsen's affiliations include Bellcore, teaching at the Technical University of Denmark, and the IBM User Interface Institute at the Thomas J. Watson Research Center. From 1994 to 1998, he was a distinguished engineer at Sun Microsystems.

=== Website usability writing ===
Beginning in 1996, Nielsen published a fortnightly column about website usability called Alertbox on his now-archived personal website useit.com. Alertbox was syndicated to, and eventually replaced by, the weblog and email newsletter on the Nielsen Norman Group website during the 2000s.

Nielsen has published several books on the subject of web design. He was a Series Editor for Morgan Kaufmann Publishers' book series focused on interactive technologies.

Nielsen founded UX Tigers in 2023 where he currently publishes articles on the topics of usability, with a heavy focus on the intersection of digital usability and artificial intelligence, and publishes video content about usability.

=== Nielsen Norman Group (NNG) ===
After his regular articles on his website about usability research attracted media attention, he co-founded usability consulting company Nielsen Norman Group (NN/g) of Fremont, California in 1998 with fellow usability expert Donald Norman. The company's vision is to help designers and other companies move toward more human-centered products and internet interactions, as experts and pioneers in the field of usability.

Nielsen founded the usability engineering movement for efficient and affordable improvements of user interfaces and he has invented several usability methods, including heuristic evaluation. He holds more than a thousand United States patents, mainly on ways of improving usability for technology.

In the early 1990s, Nielsen popularized the principle that five test users per usability test session is enough, allowing numerous tests at various stages of the development process. His argument is that "elaborate usability tests are a waste of resources." Once it is found that a few people are totally confused by a home page, little is gained by watching more people suffer through the same flawed design.

=== Jakob's law ===
Users will anticipate what an experience will be like, based on their mental models of prior experiences on websites. When making changes to a design of a website, try to minimize changes in order to maintain an ease of use.

=== Nielsen's usability heuristics ===
Nielsen's list of ten heuristics is probably the most-used usability framework for user interface design. An early version of the heuristics appeared in two papers by Nielsen and Rolf Molich published in 1989–1990. Nielsen published an updated set in 1994, and the final set still in use today was published in 2005:

1. Visibility of system status
2. Match between system and the real world
3. User control and freedom
4. Consistency and standards
5. Error prevention
6. Recognition rather than recall
7. Flexibility and efficiency of use
8. Aesthetic and minimalist design
9. Help users recognize, diagnose, and recover from errors
10. Help and documentation

In his book Usability Engineering (1993), Nielsen also defined the five quality components of his "Usability Goals":

1. Learnability
2. Efficiency
3. Memorability
4. Errors (as in low error rate)
5. Satisfaction

=== Windows 8 usability ===
Nielsen has been quoted in the computing and the mainstream press for his criticism of Microsoft's Windows 8 (2012) user interface. Tom Hobbs, creative director of the design firm Teague, criticized what he perceived to be some of Nielsen's points on the matter, and Nielsen responded with some clarifications. The subsequent short and troubled history of Windows 8, released on 26 October 2012, seems to have confirmed Nielsen's criticism: the sales of Windows-based systems plummeted after the introduction of Windows 8; Microsoft released a new version, Windows 8.1, on 18 October 2013, to fix the numerous problems identified in Windows 8, and later released Windows 10, a complete overhaul, in July 2015.

=== Criticisms ===
As Nielsen's newsletter and website grew, and with his use of "acronomic platitudes" to describe his concepts, some critics like Philip Greenspun argued that Nielsen's work was more about marketing himself than any particular research.

=== Nielsen's usability heuristics ===
In 1990, when the Nielsen heuristic evaluation guidelines were created, user interface was less complicated than it is in present-day. There has never been any research-based validation of Nielsen's heuristics. Researchers at the University of Calgary published an article in 2008, questioning if the Nielsen heuristics were an oversimplification.

Nielsen has been criticized by some visual designers and graphic designers for failing to balance the importance of other user experience considerations such as typography, readability, visual cues for hierarchy and importance, and eye appeal.

=== Responsive design ===
Nielsen's 2012 guidelines, "Repurposing vs Optimized Design" that web sites made for mobile devices be designed separately from their desktop-oriented counterparts has come under fire from Webmonkey's Scott Gilbertson, as well as Josh Clark writing in .net magazine, and Opera's Bruce Lawson, writing in Smashing Magazine, and other technologists and web designers who advocate responsive web design. In an interview with .net magazine, Nielsen explained that he wrote his guidelines from a usability perspective, not from the viewpoint of implementation.

Nielsen has been accused of taking a "puritanical" approach to usability, and not being able to keep up his usability evaluations in step of technological changes.

=== Books published ===
Nielsen's published books include:

- Nielsen, Jakob (1993). Usability Engineering. Oxford, United Kingdom: Elsevier Science. ISBN 9780125184069.
- Nielsen, Jakob (1995). Hypertext and Hypermedia. San Diego, California: Academic Press Professional, Inc. ISBN 978-0-12-518410-6.
- Nielsen, Jakob (1999). Designing Web Usability: The Practice of Simplicity. Landmark Series. New Riders. ISBN 978-1562058104.
- Nielsen, Jakob; Snyder, Carolyn; Molich, Rolf; Farrell, Susan (2001). E-Commerce User Experience. Nielsen Norman Group. ISBN 978-0970607201.
- Nielsen, Jakob; Tahir, Marie (2001). Homepage Usability: 50 Websites Deconstructed. New Riders Publishing. ISBN 978-0735711020.
- Nielsen, Jakob; Loranger, Hoa (2006). Prioritizing Web Usability. New Riders Publishing. ISBN 978-0321350312.
- Nielsen, Jakob; Pernice, Kara (2009). Eyetracking Web Usability. New Riders Publishing. ISBN 978-0321498366.
- Nielsen, Jakob; Budiu, Raluca (2012). Mobile Usability. New Riders Publishing. ISBN 978-0321884480.

=== Articles published ===
Nielsen's published articles include:

- Nielsen, Jakob; Landauer, Thomas K. (May 1993). "A mathematical model of the finding of usability problems". Proceedings of the SIGCHI conference on Human factors in computing systems - CHI '93. pp. 206–213. doi:10.1145/169059.169166. ISBN 0897915755. S2CID 207177537.
- Nielsen, Jakob (April 1994). "Usability inspection methods". Conference companion on Human factors in computing systems - CHI '94. pp. 413–414. doi:10.1145/259963.260531. ISBN 0897916514. S2CID 52808881.
- Nielsen, Jakob (April 1994). "Enhancing the explanatory power of usability heuristics". Proceedings of the SIGCHI conference on Human factors in computing systems celebrating interdependence - CHI '94. pp. 152–158. doi:10.1145/191666.191729. ISBN 0897916506. S2CID 1562556.

=== Awards and honours ===
In 2010, Nielsen was listed by Bloomberg Businessweek among 28 "World's Most Influential Designers".

In recognition of Nielsen's contributions to usability studies, in 2013 SIGCHI awarded him the Lifetime Practice Award.
