= Universal usability =

Design principle for digital interfaces

Universal usability refers to the design of information and communications products and services that are usable for every citizen. The concept has been advocated by Professor Ben Shneiderman, a computer scientist at the Human-Computer Interaction Lab at the University of Maryland, College Park. He also provided a more practical definition of universal usability – "having more than 90% of all households as successful users of information and communications services at least once a week." The concept of universal usability ("usable by all") is closely related to the concepts of universal design and design for all. These three concepts altogether cover, from the user's end to the developer's end, the three important research areas of information and communications technology (ICT): use, access, and design.

== Principles ==
Universal usability is based on the recognition that there is no “average user.” User populations vary widely in physical, cognitive, cultural, linguistic, and socioeconomic characteristics. As a result, a single static interface is often insufficient.

Research in human–computer interaction suggests that multi-layer or adaptable designs are among the most effective strategies. These systems allow users to select simpler or more advanced interaction modes as their confidence and experience grow.

Sarah Horton proposed practical principles for universal usability in web design, including

- Designing simply, using clear structure and emphasis on essential elements.
- Building with standards-based, flexible markup that supports fallback behaviour.
- Preferring HTML over proprietary formats such as PDF or Flash, which should be provided only as alternatives.

Harry Hochheiser and Ben Shneiderman further developed the Universal Usability Statement Template, which documents website content, browser requirements, network conditions, and other contextual factors influencing usability.

== Challenges ==
There are three major challenges to universal usability:

1. Supporting a broad range of hardware, software, and network access. With the advance of ICT, users' hardware, software, and network configurations are changing. The variety of ICT products creates complex systems with a broad range of hybridity. For example, would a software product be usable to users running Windows XP on a Centrino laptop with broadband Internet access and to those who have Windows 98 on a Pentium II desktop with 56K dial-up?
2. Accommodating individual differences among users, such as age, gender, abilities, literacy, culture, income, and so forth. Individual differences can be roughly categorized into three types: physical, cognitive, and socio-cultural. In the field of HCI, research attempts have been centering on accommodating physical and cognitive differences by isolating various specific factors such as spatial ability, speed of movement, eye–hand coordination, and so forth. However, previous literature has demonstrated that individual differences are difficult to pin down and difficult to generalize from one context to another.
3. Bridging the knowledge gap between what users know and what they need to know about a specific system. Two issues need to be resolved: (i) Building a user model to access individual user's background knowledge on a specific system; (ii) Integrating the mechanism of evolutionary learning.

Meeting technical accessibility standards does not guarantee usability for all users. For example WCAG provides an essential foundation for digital accessibility, yet it does not specifically require dark mode support, despite dark mode being essential rather than preferential for many blind, low-vision, and neurodivergent users who experience fatigue, headaches, and task abandonment without it. This illustrates how compliance-focused approaches can overlook features that significantly impact real-world usability.

Research has demonstrated that compliance with accessibility guidelines alone is insufficient to ensure universal usability. A controlled study found that only 27% of accessibility problems identified through usability testing with disabled users could have been detected using Web Content Accessibility Guidelines guidelines, concluding that "the application of WCAG alone is not sufficient to guarantee website accessibility."

The Journal of Usability Studies similarly notes that "while manufacturers often say things like 'we tested with an automated software tool, so we're accessible,' the reality is that nothing replaces real-world evaluations involving people with disabilities. The more inclusive the design and evaluation, the more universally usable a product or interface becomes. Guidelines alone do not lead to universally usable products.

== Electronic curb-cuts ==
The analogy "curb-cut" has been used by advocates of universal usability to explain how ICT products designed for disabled users can be beneficial to all users. Sidewalk curb-cuts are added to accommodate wheelchair users, but the benefits extend to baby carriage pushers, delivery service workers, bicyclists, and travelers with roller bags. In the context of ICT design and development, universal usability is often tied to meeting the needs of people with disabilities. The adaptability needed for users with physical, visual, auditory, or cognitive disabilities is likely to benefit users with differing preferences, tasks, hardware, etc. Hence, electronic curb-cuts – system functions that are designed for people with disabilities – may be usable by everyone in various usage situations. It might be expensive to transform an existing system to meet universal usability standards, but the extra cost of integrating electronic curb-cuts into a new system can be minimalized.

Practitioners have emphasised the importance of including users with disabilities at the earliest stages of design. Former Australian Human Rights Commissioner Edward Santow argues that "it's about bringing to the earliest stages of research and development the importance of being inclusive," noting that inaccessible digital services exclude people with disabilities "in the same way that a poorly designed bus or building prevents people with a physical disability from participating." Industry observers note that "those who stand to gain the most from digitisation are most at risk of being left behind" when excluded from testing, and that standard development practices often "park 'edge cases' to a backlog," systematically deprioritising diverse users.

== Current research development ==
Current trends in universal usability research include:

- Multimodal or adaptive user interface
- Universal usability of commercial and e-government websites
- Interface solutions for older adult users and users with disabilities
- Contextualization of universal usability

Scholarly papers on these four areas have been presented at the 1st Conference on Universal Usability in Arlington, VA, USA (2000) and the 2nd Conference on Universal Usability in Vancouver, Canada (2003).

== Examples ==
- Computer systems allowing the interchangeable use of several input devices, e.g. track ball, mouse keyboard, joy stick or laser pointer.
- Computer keyboard that accommodate the physical differences between user, e.g. distance between keys, size of keys, and required pressure.
- IBM's Web Adaptation Technology transforms Web pages "on-the-fly" to meet individual needs.
- Websites that provide both multimedia version (for high bandwidth users) and text-only version (for low bandwidth users).
- NIH Senior Health features "one-click" text adjustment, contrast control, and text-to-speech technology.

== See also ==
- Accessible housing
- Accessible toilet
- Assistive technology
- Game accessibility
- Inclusion (disability rights)
- Knowbility
- Right to mobility
- Universal design
- Usability testing
- Usability
- World Usability Day
