= Leah Findlater =

Canadian/American computer scientist

Academic background
- Education: University of Regina (BS); University of British Columbia (MS, PhD)
- Doctoral advisor: Joanna McGrenere

Academic work
- Discipline: Computer science
- Sub-discipline: Human–computer interaction Mobile computing Computer accessibility
- Institutions: University of Maryland, College Park; University of Washington

Leah K. Findlater is a Canadian-American computer scientist specializing in human-computer interaction, mobile computing, and computer accessibility. She is an associate professor of computer science at the University of Washington.

== Education ==
Findlater studied computer science at the University of Regina, graduating with high honors in 2001. She went to the University of British Columbia (UBC) for graduate study, becoming a participant there in Maria Klawe's project on aphasia. She earned a master's degree at UBC in 2004, with the thesis Comparing Static, Adaptable, and Adaptive Menus, and completed her Ph.D. in 2009 with the dissertation Supporting Feature Awareness and Improving Performance with Personalized Graphical User Interfaces, both under the supervision of Joanna McGrenere.

== Career ==
After postdoctoral research at the University of Washington with Professor Jacob O. Wobbrock, Findlater joined the College of Information Studies faculty, UMIACS, and University of Maryland Human–Computer Interaction Lab. She returning to the University of Washington as a faculty member in 2017.

Findlater's research has included work on a voice-based software assistant to help blind people navigate the internet, and an augmented reality system to provide real-time captioning for hard-of-hearing people.
