= Tree testing =

Method of evaluating topic trees for findability

Tree testing is a usability technique for evaluating the findability of topics in a website. It is also known as reverse card sorting or card-based classification.

A large website is typically organized into a hierarchy (a "tree") of topics and subtopics. Tree testing provides a way to measure how well users can find items in this hierarchy.

Unlike traditional usability testing, tree testing is not done on the website itself; instead, a simplified text version of the site structure is used. This ensures that the structure is evaluated in isolation, nullifying the effects of navigational aids, visual design, and other factors.

== Basic method ==
In a typical tree test:

1. The participant is given a "find it" task (e.g., "Look for men's belts under $25").
2. They are shown a text list of the top-level topics of the website.
3. They choose a heading, and are then shown a list of subtopics.
4. They continue choosing (moving down through the tree, backtracking if necessary) until they find a topic that satisfies the task (or until they give up).
5. They do several tasks in this manner, starting each task back at the top of the tree.
6. Once several participants have completed the test, the results are analyzed.

== Analyzing the results ==
The analysis typically tries to answer these questions:

- Could users successfully find particular items in the tree?
- Could they find those items directly, without having to backtrack?
- If they couldn't find items, where did they go astray?
- Could they choose between topics quickly, without having to think too much?
- Overall, which parts of the tree worked well, and which fell down?

== Tools ==
Tree testing was originally done on paper (typically using index cards), but can now also be conducted using specialized research software.
