= Adaptive user interface =

Responsive frontend experience

An adaptive user interface (also known as AUI) is a user interface (UI) which adapts, that is changes, its layout and elements to the needs of the user or context and is similarly alterable by each user.

These mutually reciprocal qualities of both adapting and being adaptable are, in a true AUI, also innate to elements that comprise the interface's components; portions of the interface might adapt to and affect other portions of the interface.

This later mechanism is usually employed to integrate two logically distinct components, such as an interactive document and an application (e.g. a web browser) into one seamless whole.

The user adaptation is often a negotiated process, as an adaptive user interface's designers ignore where user interface components ought to go while affording a means by which both the designers and the user can determine their placement, often (though not always) in a semi-automated, if not fully automated manner.

An AUI is primarily created based on the features of the system, and the knowledge levels of the users that will utilize it.

== Advantages ==
The advantages of an adaptive user interface are found within its ability to conform to a users needs. The properties of an AUI allow to show only relevant information based on the current user. This creates less confusion for less experienced users and provides ease of access throughout a system.

Depending on the task, can increase the stability of a system.

== Disadvantages ==
Time-consuming process.

The AUI must be designed with varying levels of implementation in mind, and be coupled with a way to measure any particular users needs.

Requires knowing a user's goal in order to most efficiently adapt. On top of being an issue from sorting and interpreting information from the user in order to predict their needs, this can give rise to security issues. Because the information is stored, users lack privacy when utilizing an AUI.

== Types ==
An adaptive user interface can be implemented in various ways. These implementations can differ between the amount of information available to certain users, or how users utilize the application.

=== Adaptive presentation ===
The goal behind adaptive presentation is to display certain information based on the current user. This may mean that users with only basic knowledge of a system will only be shown minimal information. Conversely, a user with advanced knowledge will have access to more detailed information and capabilities.

A way that the AUI can achieve this differentiation could be to hide information to be presented based on the user's experience level. Another possibility is to control the number of links to relevant sources on the page.

=== Adaptive navigation ===
Adaptive navigation intends to guide a user to their specific goal within the system by altering the way the system is navigated based on certain factors of the user. These factors can include the users expertise level with the system/subject, the current goal within the system, and other relevant factors.

Examples of adaptive navigation can be achieved in many ways, similar to adaptive presentation. These can include examples such as providing links to help achieve a user's specific goal, giving reference on a page to where a user is, or altering the resources available to the user.

== Uses in industry ==
Adaptable user interfaces can be used in any situation where a user would benefit from a personalized UI. One of the common place implementations of an AUI is in the medical industry. The AUI is used to differentiate and specify which information should be shown to which type of user. For instance, a patient would be shown a different level of detail than the doctor, or nurse.

== See also ==
- Context-sensitive user interface
