= ISO 9241 =

Multi-part standard from the International Organization for Standardization

ISO 9241 is a multi-part standard from the International Organization for Standardization (ISO) covering ergonomics of human-system interaction and related, human-centered design processes (see also human-computer interaction). It is managed by the ISO Technical Committee 159. It was originally titled Ergonomic requirements for office work with visual display terminals (VDTs). From 2006 onwards, the standards were retitled to the more generic Ergonomics of Human System Interaction.

As part of this change, ISO is renumbering some parts of the standard so that it can cover more topics, e.g. tactile and haptic interaction. For example, two zeros in the number indicate that the document under consideration is a generic or basic standard. Fundamental aspects are regulated in standards ending with one zero. A standard with three digits other than zero in the number regulate specific aspects. The first part to be renumbered was part 10 (now renumbered to part 110).

Part 1 is a general introduction to the rest of the standard. Part 2 addresses task design for working with computer systems. Parts 3 to 9 deal with physical characteristics of computer equipment. Part 110 and parts 11 to 19 deal with usability aspects of software, including Part 110 (a general set of usability heuristics for the design of different types of dialogue) and Part 11 (general guidance on the specification and measurement of usability).

== Ergonomics of Human System Interaction ==
The revised multipart standard is numbered in series as follows:

- 100 series: Software ergonomics
- 200 series: Human system interaction processes
- 300 series: Displays and display related hardware
- 400 series: Physical input devices - ergonomics principles
- 500 series: Workplace ergonomics
- 600 series: Environment ergonomics
- 700 series: Application domains - Control rooms
- 900 series: Tactile and haptic interactions

Within those series, the standard currently includes the following parts:

- Part 100: Introduction to standards related to software ergonomics
- Part 110: Dialogue principles
- Part 112: Principles for the presentation of information
- Part 125: Guidance on visual presentation of information
- Part 129: Guidance on software individualization
- Part 151: Guidance on World Wide Web user interfaces
- Part 143: Forms
- Part 154: Interactive voice response (IVR) applications
- Part 161: Guidance on visual user interface elements
- Part 171: Guidance on software accessibility
- Part 210: Human-centred design for interactive systems
- Part 300: Introduction to electronic visual display requirements
- Part 302: Terminology for electronic visual displays
- Part 303: Requirements for electronic visual displays
- Part 304: User performance test methods for electronic visual displays
- Part 305: Optical laboratory test methods for electronic visual displays
- Part 306: Field assessment methods for electronic visual displays
- Part 307: Analysis and compliance test methods for electronic visual displays
- Part 308: Surface-conduction electron-emitter displays (SED)
- Part 309 (TR): Organic light-emitting diode (OLED) displays
- Part 310 (TR): Visibility, aesthetics and ergonomics of pixel defects
- Part 400: Principles and requirements for physical input devices
- Part 410: Design criteria for physical input devices
- Part 910: Framework for tactile and haptic interaction
- Part 920: Guidance on tactile and haptic interactions

=== ISO 9241-110 ===
(formerly ISO 9241-10:1996 Ergonomic requirements for office work with visual display terminals (VDTs) -- Part 10: Dialogue principles. / withdrawn)
(formerly ISO 9241-110:2006 Ergonomics of human-system interaction — Part 110: Dialogue principles. / withdrawn)

The first edition of ISO 9241-110 was issued in 2006. In 2020, a revised version (second edition) was published, titled "Ergonomics of human-system interaction — Part 110: Interaction principles". The core idea of the standard was not changed. Interaction principles are design guidelines for user interfaces that embody principles. The seven interaction principles are applicable to the design of any user interface, whether it is software, hardware or a combination of both.

Some principles have been refined to be more appropriate to today's possibilities or forms of interaction and User Engagement has been introduced as a new interaction principle. For each interaction principle, general design recommendations are given, which helps to follow them when designing user interfaces.

- Suitability for the user's tasks
- Self-descriptiveness
- Conformity with user expectations
- Learnability
- Controllability
- Use error robustness
- User engagement

The 2020 revision tied the earlier principle of individualisation into the principle of controllability, and introduced the principle of user engagement.

=== ISO 9241-210 ===
(formerly ISO 13407:1999 Human-centred design processes for interactive systems, withdrawn)

Part 210: Human-centred Design; This part, updated in 2019, provides guidance on human-system interaction as holistic approach to plan, research, conceptualize, specify, design, develop, deploy and maintain interactive systems throughout their life cycle. It also covers the importance of sustainability and accessibility within the human-centered approach.

With its introduction in 2008, it revised ISO 13407, Human-centred design for interactive systems.

=== ISO-9241-302, 303, 305, 307:2008 pixel defects ===
Of particular interest to the lay computer user are the definitions of flat-panel TV and monitor pixel defects provided in the ISO-9241-3xx series of standards (which renders obsolete ISO 13406-2). These identify three classes for measuring pixel defects in flat panel monitors:

- Class 0 panels are completely defect-free, including no full pixel or sub-pixel defects.
- Class 1 panels permit any or all of the following:
  - 1 full bright (“stuck on white”) pixel
  - 1 full dark (“stuck off”) pixel
  - 2 single or double bright or dark sub-pixels
  - 3 to 5 “stuck on” or “stuck off” sub-pixels (depending on the number of each)
- Class 2 panels permit any or all of the following:
  - 2 full bright pixels
  - 2 full dark pixels
  - 5-10 single or double bright or dark sub-pixels (again, depending on the number of each; no more than 5 bright (“stuck on”) subpixels are permitted).
- Class 3 panels permit any or all of the following:
  - 5 full bright pixels
  - 15 full dark pixels
  - 50 single or double sub-pixels stuck on or off

(allowed pixel defects per 1 (one) million pixels in the TFT/LCD matrix)

As of 2010, most premium branded panel manufacturers specify their products as Class 0, expecting a small number of returns due to early failure where a particular item fails to meet Class 0 but would meet Class 1. Budget panel manufacturers tend to specify their products as Class 1. Most premium branded finished product manufacturers (retail TVs, monitors, laptops, etc.) tend to specify their products as meeting Class 1 even when they have a Class 0 specified panel inside. Some premium branded finished product manufacturers have started to specify their products as Class 0 or offer a Class 0 guarantee for an additional premium.

== Previous version ==
ISO 9241 was originally titled Ergonomic requirements for office work with visual display terminals (VDTs) and consisted of the following parts:

- Part 1: General introduction
- Part 2: Guidance on task requirements
- Part 3: Visual display requirements
- Part 4: Keyboard requirements
- Part 5: Workstation layout and postural requirements
- Part 6: Guidance on the work environment
- Part 7: Display requirements with reflections
- Part 8: Requirements for displayed colors
- Part 9: Requirements for non-keyboard input devices
- Part 10: Dialogue principles
- Part 11: Guidance on usability
- Part 12: Presentation of information
- Part 13: User guidance
- Part 14: Menu dialogues
- Part 15: Command dialogues
- Part 16: Direct manipulation dialogues
- Part 17: Form filling dialogues
- Part 20: Accessibility guidelines for ICT equipment and services

=== ISO 9241-1 ===
Part 1: (1997) Ergonomic requirements for office work with visual display terminals (VDTs) : General Introduction This part introduces the multi-part standard ISO 9241 for the ergonomic requirements for the use of visual display terminals for office tasks and explains some of the basic underlying principles. It provides some guidance on how to use the standard and describes how conformance to parts of ISO 9241 should be reported.

=== ISO 9241-2 ===
Part 2: (1993) Guidance on task requirements This part deals with the design of tasks and jobs involving work with visual display terminals. It provides guidance on how task requirements may be identified and specified within individual organisations and how task requirements can be incorporated into the system design and implementation process.

=== ISO 9241-3 ===
Part 3: (1993, deprecated) Visual display requirements This part specifies the ergonomics requirements for display screens which ensure that they can be read comfortably, safely and efficiently to perform office tasks. Although it deals specifically with displays used in offices, it is appropriate to specify it for most applications that require general purpose displays to be used in an office-like environment.

=== ISO 9241-4 ===
Part 4: (1998) Keyboard requirements This part specifies the ergonomics design characteristics of an alphanumeric keyboard which may be used comfortably, safely and efficiently to perform office tasks. Keyboard layouts are dealt with separately in various parts of ISO/IEC 9995: 1994 Information Processing - Keyboard Layouts for Text and Office Systems

=== ISO 9241-5 ===
Part 5: (1998) Workstation layout and postural requirements This part specifies the ergonomics requirement for a Visual Display Terminal workplace which will allow the user to adopt a comfortable and efficient posture.

=== ISO 9241-6 ===
Part 6: (1999) Environmental requirements This part specifies the ergonomics requirements for the Visual Display Terminal working environment which will provide the user with comfortable, safe and productive working conditions.

=== ISO 9241-7 ===
Part 7: (1998, deprecated) Display requirements with reflections This part specifies methods of measurement of glare and reflections from the surface of display screens, including those with surface treatments.

=== ISO 9241-8 ===
Part 8: (1997, deprecated) Requirements for displayed colors This part specifies the requirements for multicolour displays which are largely in addition to the monochrome requirements in Part 3.

=== ISO 9241-9 ===
Part 9: (2000) Requirements for non-keyboard input devices This part specifies the ergonomics requirements for non-keyboard input devices which may be used in conjunction with a visual display terminal. It also includes a suggestion for a user-based performance test as an alternative way of showing conformance. The standard covers such devices as the mouse, trackball and other pointing devices, but it does not address voice input.

=== ISO 9241-10 ===
Part 10 (1996, withdrawn) "Dialogue principles": Gives ergonomic principles formulated in general terms; they are presented without reference to situations of use, application, environment or technology. These principles are intended to be used in specifications, design and evaluation of dialogues for office work with visual display terminals (VDTs).

=== ISO 9241-11 ===
Part 11: (1998) To examine the quality of how well tasks are fulfilled by the users (usability testing), ISO 9241-11 framework can be employed.

There are three components in the framework: System Effectiveness to examine the users’ ability to complete the given tasks, System Efficiency to examine the required user resources to complete the tasks, and System Satisfaction to record the users’ opinions and feedback.

System Effectiveness: Participants are asked to complete six tasks, and the success or failure rate of completing each task is measured to evaluate the app's efficiency. Task completion is considered successful when the user completed the task without producing an error or asking for assistance.

System Efficiency: For evaluating system efficiency, the researcher records the time (in seconds) that participants took to complete each task. Each task is initiated by expressing the word ‘start’ and finished when the user mentioned the end. Upon completing each task, the user is asked to fill out the Single Ease Questionnaire (SEQ) to examine the level of task difficulty. The questionnaire is a seven-point Likert scale in which scale 1 indicates the task as ‘very difficult’, and scale 7 indicates the task as ‘very easy’.

System Satisfaction is used to evaluate the overall usability of the apps through System Usability Scale (SUS), which is a usability assessment questionnaire with reliable and valid results. It includes ten questions, each with five items ranging from ‘strongly agree’ to ‘strongly disagree’. The score range is from 0 to 100 and scores higher than 80 are considered high usability while those below 70 are considered low usability.

=== ISO 9241-12 ===
Part 12: (1998) Presentation of information

This part contains specific recommendations for presenting and representing information on visual displays. It includes guidance on ways of representing complex information using alphanumeric and graphical/symbolic codes, screen layout, and design as well as the use of windows.

=== ISO 9241-13 ===
Part 13: (1998) User guidance

This part provides recommendations for the design and evaluation of user guidance attributes of software user interfaces including Prompts, Feedback, Status, On-line Help and Error Management.

=== ISO 9241-14 ===
Part 14: (1997) Menu dialogues

This part provides recommendations for the ergonomic design of menus used in user-computer dialogues. The recommendations cover menu structure, navigation, option selection and execution, and menu presentation (by various techniques including windowing, panels, buttons, fields, etc.).

=== ISO 9241-15 ===
Part 15: (1998) Command language dialogues

This part provides recommendations for the ergonomic design of command languages used in user-computer dialogues. The recommendations cover command language structure and syntax, command representations, input and output considerations, and feedback and help.

=== ISO 9241-16 ===
Part 16: (1999) Direct manipulation dialogues

This part provides recommendations for the ergonomic design of direct manipulation dialogues, and includes the manipulation of objects, and the design of metaphors, objects and attributes. It covers those aspects of graphical user interfaces that are directly manipulated, and not covered by other parts of ISO 9241.

=== ISO 9241-17 ===
Part 17: (1998) Form-filling dialogues

This part provides recommendations for the ergonomic design of form filling dialogues. The recommendations cover form structure and output considerations, input considerations, and form navigation.
