= CMN-GOMS =

Human-computer interaction template

CMN-GOMS stands for Card, Moran and Newell GOMS. CMN-GOMS is the original version of the GOMS technique in human computer interaction. It takes the name after its creators Stuart Card, Thomas P. Moran and Allen Newell who first described GOMS in their 1983 book The Psychology of Human Computer Interaction.

== Overview ==
This technique requires a strict goal-method-operation-selection rules structure. The structure is rigid enough that the evaluator represents the tasks in a pseudo-code format (no formal syntax is dictated). It also provides a guide for how to formulate selection rules. This method can also be used to estimate the load the task places on the user. For instance, examining the number of levels down the task-tree that a goal branch is can be used to estimate the memory demand the task places on the system. The process must remember information about all of the levels above the current branch.

This technique is more flexible than the Keystroke-Level Model (KLM) because the pseudo-code is in a general form. That is, it can be executed for different scenarios by going down different branches, while KLM's procedure is a simple list that has to be recreated for each different task.

== Example of a simple goal ==
Deleting a file in Windows Explorer (NOTE: not all goals are fully expanded in this example).

GOAL: DELETE-FILE
.   GOAL: SELECT-FILE
.   .   [select:  GOAL: KEYBOARD-TAB-METHOD
.   .             GOAL: MOUSE-METHOD]
.   .   VERIFY-SELECTION
.   GOAL: ISSUE-DELETE-COMMAND
.   .   [select*: GOAL: KEYBOARD-DELETE-METHOD
.   .             .   PRESS-DELETE
.   .             .   GOAL: CONFIRM-DELETE
.   .             GOAL: DROP-DOWN-MENU-METHOD
.   .             .   MOVE-MOUSE-OVER-FILE-ICON
.   .             .   CLICK-RIGHT-MOUSE-BUTTON
.   .             .   LOCATE-DELETE-COMMAND
.   .             .   MOVE-MOUSE-TO-DELETE-COMMAND
.   .             .   CLICK-LEFT-MOUSE-BUTTON
.   .             .   GOAL: CONFIRM-DELETE
.   .             GOAL: DRAG-AND-DROP-METHOD
.   .             .   MOVE-MOUSE-OVER-FILE-ICON
.   .             .   PRESS-LEFT-MOUSE-BUTTON
.   .             .   LOCATE-RECYCLING-BIN
.   .             .   MOVE-MOUSE-TO-RECYCLING-BIN
.   .             .   RELEASE-LEFT-MOUSE-BUTTON]

*Selection rule for GOAL: ISSUE-DELETE-COMMAND
  If hands are on keyboard, use KEYBOARD-DELETE-METHOD,
    else if Recycle bin is visible, use DRAG-AND-DROP-METHOD,
    else use DROP-DOWN-MENU-METHOD

== See also ==
- Human information processor model
- CPM-GOMS
- KLM-GOMS
- NGOMSL
