= Arena shooter =

Subgenre of shooter games

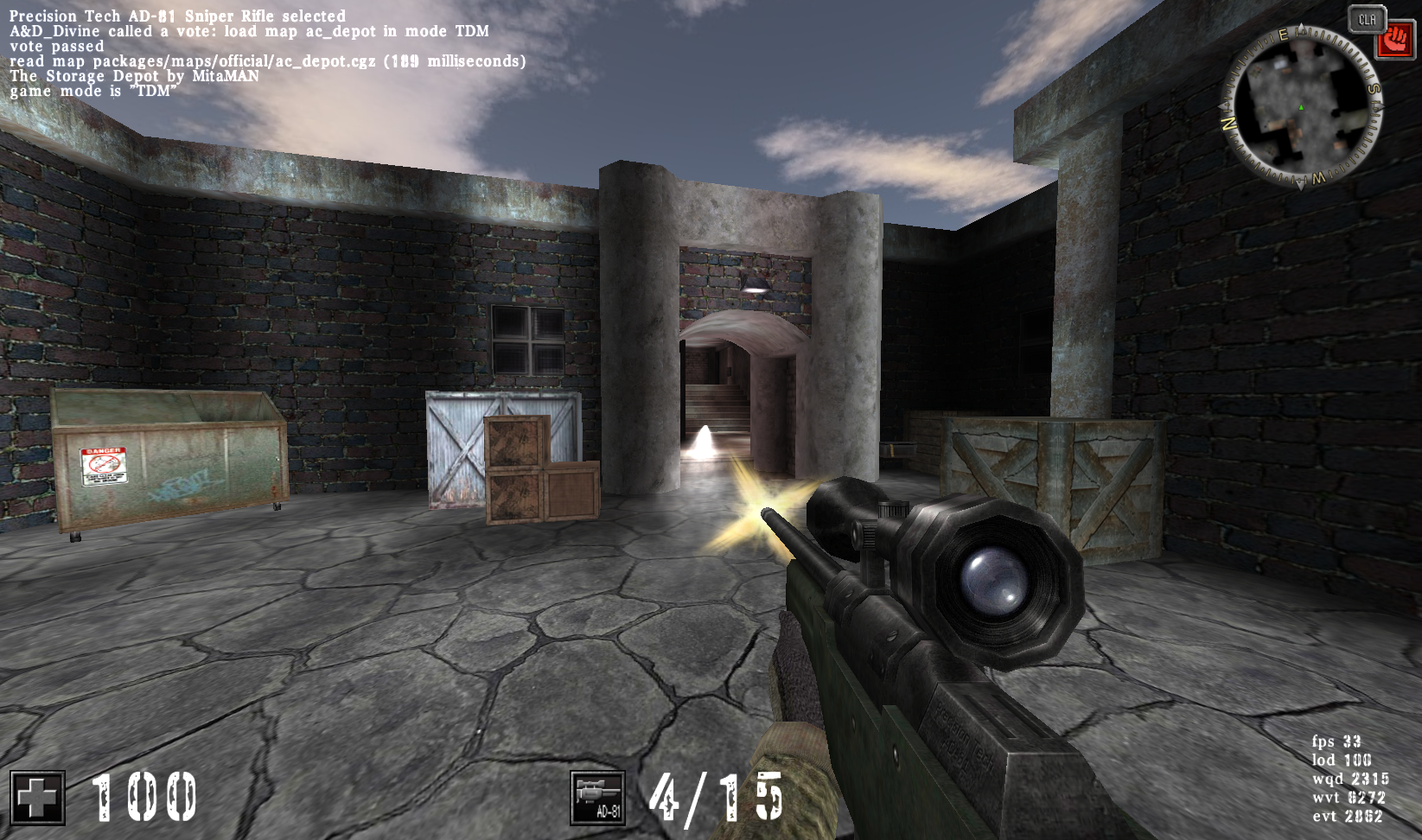
AssaultCube, a 2008 arena shooter

An arena shooter is a subgenre of shooter games and multiplayer games that cover both the first-person shooter and third-person shooter genres. These games emphasize fast-paced movement in enclosed map designs that foster engagement between players.

== Game design ==
Arena shooters are multiplayer shooter games with several key characteristics. Players will start with a basic load out that is upgradable via weapons and power-ups contained at certain points in a map. Arena shooters may employ movement mechanics that allow for skillful gameplay, such as strafing to avoid gunshots, using rockets explosions from weapons to jump higher, or using items to otherwise move quickly throughout the map. These mechanics are often paired with relatively fast movement speed. Maps in arena shooters are structured in a way that facilitate interaction and combat among players, often utilizing elements like portals or jump pads to provide additional options for movement.

== History ==
Arena shooters can be traced back to the early days of first person shooters with the first modern shooter, Wolfenstein 3D (1992), establishing the basic groundwork of shooter mechanics which were later replicated in future games. In these early shooters the weapons were held and aimed in the middle of the screen and did not require the player to reload. Doom (1993) featured faster-paced gameplay and more action on screen. This style of gameplay would continue into the 3D era with Quake (1996) following the same formula.

While Wolfenstein 3D had no multiplayer capabilities, Doom introduced the deathmatch game mode which focused on combat between players on the game's maps. Other games that followed it, including Marathon, Duke Nukem 3D and the first two Quake games also allowed for such matches to be played online or on the local network. Nonetheless, these games still featured single player as the principal mode of play. The first real arena shooters were Unreal Tournament (1999), Turok: Rage Wars (1999) and Quake III Arena (1999), although the game MIDI Maze for the Atari ST had featured a similar multiplayer-only concept as early as 1987. These games, in contrast to previous entries in their respective series, were focused on multiplayer matches, and the single player component focused on playing the same multiplayer maps with computer-controlled bots. More game modes besides the standard deathmatch were also introduced, including the popular capture the flag mode. Both genres helped popularized the LAN party scene with the popularity of Quake leading to the creation of its own convention, QuakeCon, where numerous people would meet up to compete in professional and amateur tournaments locally. The popularity of the genre was such that certain open-source games in a similar style were also developed in the early 2000s, such as Cube and Warsow.

While the arena shooters were wildly popular in 1999 and the early 2000s, arena shooters have fallen out of popularity compared to other subgenres in the shooter genre. There have been attempts to release new titles in the genre with Quake Champions in 2017. Quake Champions has a Battle Pass system with several content updates a year, as well as an e-Sports league known as the Quake Pro League, ran in joint effort by both Bethesda, and Pro Gamer League (PGL). Epic Games also tried to bring back Unreal Tournament with a new entry, but this was put on hold shortly afterward and was later canceled. The majority of arena shooters released today are by independent developers with the likes of Reflex Arena, Diabotical, and Master Arena being popular among a niche group. While there have been some games with "arena" elements in recent times such as Doom (2016), Doom Eternal (2020), and Ultrakill (2020), there have been no games in the genre released by major publishers.

== See also ==
- Shoot 'em up
