= NGOMSL =

NGOMSL (Natural GOMS Language) is a variation of the GOMS technique in human computer interaction.

== Overview ==
Natural GOMS Language technique was developed by David Kieras in 1988. The motivation was to make GOMS/CCT (cognitive complexity theory) simple to use, and still keep the power and flexibility of standard GOMS. This was necessary because GOMS did not have very well defined semantics. This lack of definition meant that two equally competent evaluators could do evaluations on the same system and come up with very different results. Kieras's result was the development of high-level (natural language) syntax for GOMS representation with directions for doing a GOMS evaluation. The recipe is referred to as a "top-down, breadth-first" expansion. The user's high-level goals are unfolded until only operators remain. Generally operators are considered to be keystroke-level operations, but that is not a rigid requirement.

Since NGOMSL is based on CCT, it has certain properties that make it unique. NGOMSL inherits the ability to not only give estimations for execution times but it can also estimate the time taken to learn how to use the system. It also, however, shares one of the major disadvantages all of the previous methods. NGOMSL models user interaction as a serial operation. One operation occupies the user completely, there is no multitasking, which makes NGOMSL inappropriate for analyzing tasks where the users are under time pressure, highly practiced and, in reality, do act in a parallel fashion.

== See also ==
- Human information processor model
- CPM-GOMS
- KLM-GOMS
- CMN-GOMS
