= Relex =

Relex may refer to:

- DG RELEX, a Directorate-General of the European Commission
- Operation Relex
- RELEX Group, the developer of Linter SQL RDBMS
- ReLEx SMILE, a type of laser surgery
- Relex Software, acquired by software company PTC

== See also ==
- Relexification, a linguistic process
- RELX
- Reflex (disambiguation)
