= Brushing and linking =

Data visualization technique

In databases, brushing and linking is the connection of two or more views of the same data, such that a change to the representation in one view affects the representation in the other. Brushing and linking is also an important technique in interactive visual analysis, a method for performing visual exploration and analysis of large, structured data sets.

Specifically, linking consists of a change of parameters (for example a data filter) in one data representation being reflected in other connected data representations. Brushing may, for example, highlight the selected data from one view in other connected data representations.

One example might be a two-part display, consisting of a histogram alongside a list of document titles. The histogram could show how many documents were published each month. Brushing and linking would allow the user to assign a color, green for instance, to one bar of the histogram, thus causing the titles in the list display that were published during the corresponding month to also be highlighted in green.

== History ==
The technique and name 'brushing' were introduced in the 1980s by Richard A. Becker and William S. Cleveland.

== See also ==
- Focus-plus-context screen
- Interactive visual analysis
