= Goms =

Goms may refer to:

- Goms (region), the upper most part of the Valais, Switzerland
- Goms (district), in the canton of Valais, Switzerland
- Goms, Valais, a municipality in Valais, Switzerland, created in 2017
- GOMS, method in human–computer interaction
