= Human-centered computing (disambiguation) =

Human-centered computing may refer to:

- Human-centered computing, an academic discipline
- Human-centered computing (NASA), a subproject of NASA's intelligent systems project
