= Information visualization reference model =

The Information visualization reference model is an example of a reference model for information visualization, developed by Ed Chi in 1999, under the name of the data state model. Chi showed that the framework successfully modeled a wide array of visualization applications and later showed that the model was functionally equivalent to the data flow model used in existing graphics toolkits such as VTK.

== Overview ==
In previous work, according to Chi (2000), "researchers have attempted to construct taxonomies of information visualization techniques by examining the data domains that are compatible with these techniques. This is useful because implementers can quickly identify various techniques that can be applied to their domain of interest. However, these taxonomies do not help the implementers understand how to apply and implement these techniques".

According to Chi (2000), he and J.T. Reidl "in 1998 extends and proposes a new way to taxonomize information visualization techniques by using the Data State Model. Many of the techniques share similar operating steps that can easily be reused. The Data State Model not only helps researchers understand the space of design, but also helps implementers understand how information visualization techniques can be applied more broadly".

In 1999 Stuart Card, Jock D. Mackinlay, and Ben Shneiderman present their own interpretation of this pattern, dubbing it the information visualization reference model.
