= Ann Blandford =

British professor

Ann Blandford FHEA
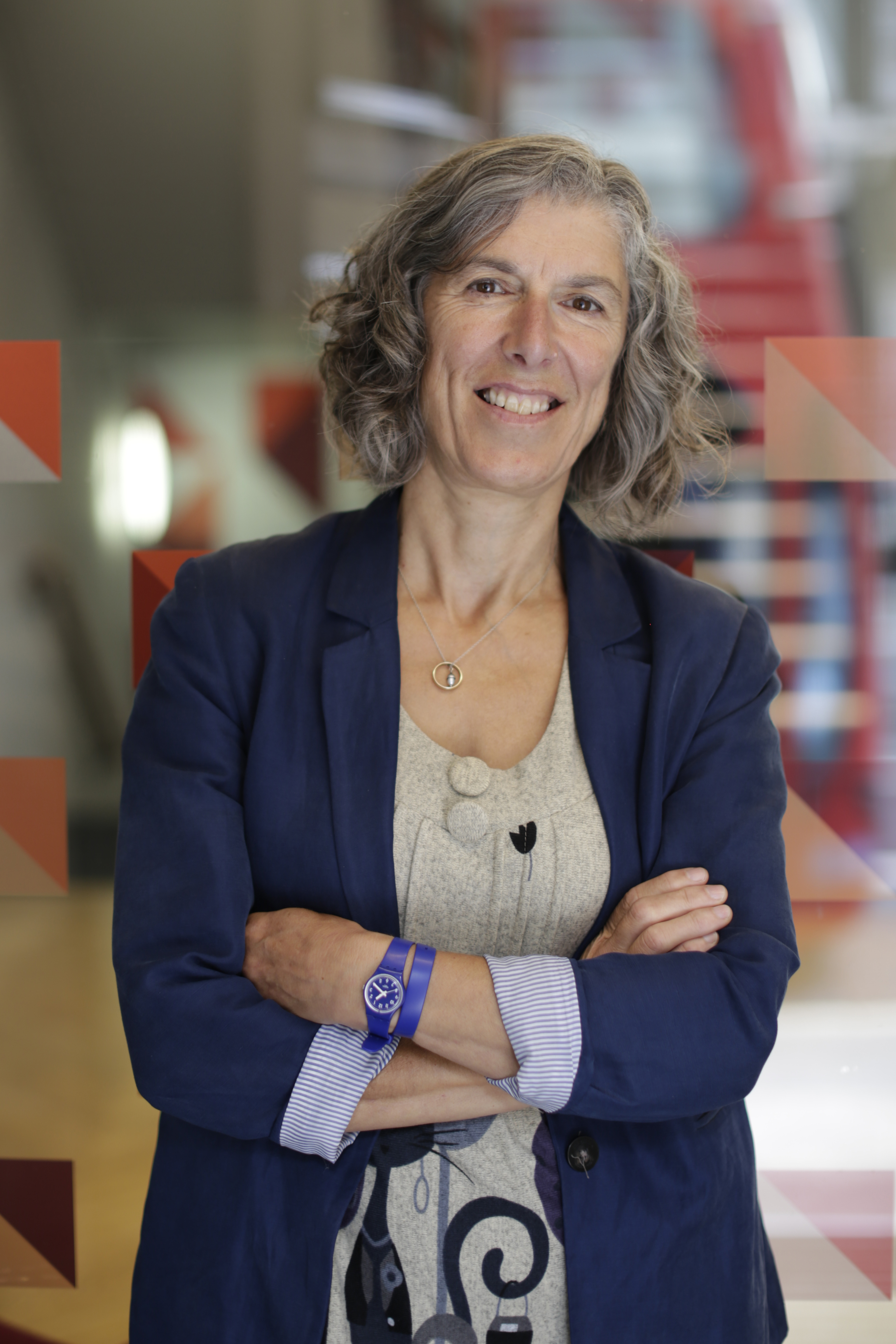
- Education: University of Cambridge (BA); Open University (PhD)
- Awards: Suffrage Science award (2016)
- Scientific career
- Fields: Human–Computer Interaction; Human factors Patient safety Healthcare; Information interaction
- Workplaces: University College London; Middlesex University
- Thesis: Design, decisions and dialogue (1991)
- Doctoral advisor: Eileen Scanlon; Mark Elsom-Cook
- Website: uclic.ucl.ac.uk/people/ann-blandford

Ann Blandford FHEA is Professor of Human-Computer Interaction (HCI) at University College London (UCL). She serves as deputy director of the UCL Institute of Healthcare Engineering. Her research focuses on behaviour change, well-being, and human errors in the field of healthcare.

== Education ==
Blandford graduated with a Bachelor of Arts in mathematics from the University of Cambridge. She worked as a software engineer before pursuing a PhD in artificial intelligence (AI) and education at the Open University supervised by Eileen Scanlon and Mark Elsom-Cook.

== Career and research ==
Blandford previously served as professor at the interaction design centre at Middlesex University from 1995 to 2001.

Blandford has served as professor in human-computer interaction at UCL since 2002, where her research has involved studies of serendipity, leading to a proposal for a new definition of the phenomenon. With Stephann Makri she worked to further refine their classification of "serendipitous occurrences". Her current work covers HCI research in digital health, including challenges of interdisciplinarity.

=== Awards and honours ===
In 2016, Blandford became one of the first 12 women to receive a Suffrage Science award for contributions to the field of maths and computing.
