= Jock D. Mackinlay =

American information visualization expert

- Born: August 16, 1952 (age 74); Nuremberg, Germany
- Education: Stanford University
- Known for: Information visualization, Interactive visual analysis, Information visualization reference model, Visual analytics
- Awards: IEEE Visualization Technical Achievement Award, ACM Distinguished Member, IEEE Visual Languages 1998 Best Paper Award
- Scientific career
- Fields: Computer science, human–computer interaction, information visualization
- Doctoral advisor: Michael Genesereth

Jock D. Mackinlay (born August 16, 1952) is an American information visualization expert and Vice President of Research and Design at Tableau Software. With Stuart Card, George G. Robertson and others he invented a number of information visualization techniques.

== Education ==
Jock Mackinlay was born in Nuremberg, Germany, and received his BA in mathematics and computer science from UC Berkeley in 1975 and his PhD in computer science from Stanford University in 1986, where he pioneered the automatic design of graphical presentations of relational information.

== Career ==
In 1976, Mackinlay started working as a systems analyst for the Bank of America in San Francisco. In 1977 he became a systems analyst at Minimax Research Corporation. From 1979 to 1986 he was a research assistant at Stanford University while getting his PhD. In 1986 he joined Xerox PARC, where he collaborated with the User Interface Research Group to develop many novel applications of computer graphics for information access, coining the term "information visualization". Much of the fruits of this research can be seen in his 1999 published book, Readings in Information Visualization: Using Vision to Think, written and edited with Stuart Card and Ben Shneiderman.

In 2000, Mackinlay took a year-long sabbatical from Xerox PARC to work as a visiting professor at Aarhus University in Denmark, where he taught courses in Information Visualization and User Interfaces of Mobile Devices (co-taught with Polle Zellweger).

In 2003, Mackinlay was on Chris Stolte's dissertation committee at Stanford along with Professor Pat Hanrahan. Stolte and Hanrahan had extended Mackinlay's dissertation to a formal specification language that combines query, analysis, and visualization into a single framework. They went on to found Tableau Software after Stolte graduated. Mackinlay joined Tableau Software in 2004 as Director of Visual Analysis. He holds numerous patents in user interfaces and visual analysis.

== Research and awards ==
Mackinlay has been an active member of the academic research community since the late 1980s. He was UIST'91 program chair and UIST'92 conference chair, and was papers co-chair for CHI'96. He was also on the editorial boards for ACM TOCHI (1997-2003) and IEEE CG&A (2004-6).

He has received many awards for his work, including the best paper award at IEEE Visual Languages 1998 (co-authored with Polle Zellweger, Bay-Wei Chang, and Takeo Igarashi). In 2005, Mackinlay won DMReview's data visualization competition. In 2009, he received the Visualization Technical Achievement Award from the IEEE Visualization and Graphics Technical Committee for his seminal technical work on automatic presentation tools and new visual metaphors for information visualization. Mackinlay became an ACM Distinguished Member in 2013.

In 2023, Mackinlay was elected to the National Academy of Engineering, "For contributions to the fields of computational data visualization and information visualization".

== See also ==
- Information visualization reference model
- Prefuse
- Visual analytics
- Interactive visual analysis

== Publications ==
Books:

- 1999. Readings in Information Visualization: Using Vision to Think. With Stuart K. Card and Ben Shneiderman. Morgan Kaufmann.

Articles:

- 1986. "Automating the Design of Graphical Presentations of Relational Information". in: ACM Transactions on Graphics. 5(2, April), 110-141.
- 1989. "The cognitive coprocessor architecture for interactive user interfaces". With S. K. Card, and George G. Robertson. In: Proceedings of the ACM SIGGRAPH Symposium on User Interface Software and Technology, pages 10–18. ACM Press, Nov 1989.
- 1991. "Cone Trees: Animated 3D Visualizations of Hierarchical Information". With George G. Robertson and Stuart K. Card. In: Robertson, Scott P., Olson, Gary M. and Olson, Judith S. (eds.) Proceedings of the ACM CHI 91 Human Factors in Computing Systems Conference April 28 - June 5, 1991, New Orleans, Louisiana. pp. 189–194.
- 1993. "Information Visualization Using 3D Interactive Animation". With Stuart K. Card, and George G. Robertson. In: Communications of the ACM, 36(4), April 1993. pp. 57–71.
- 1993. "The document lens". With George G. Robertson. In: Proceedings of the ACM Symposium on User Interface Software and Technology. ACM Press, Nov 1993.
- 2000. "Opportunities for Information Visualization". In: IEEE Computer Graphics and Applications 20(1).
- 2004. "Log-based Longitudinal Study Finds Window Thrashing". With C. Royer.
- 2007. "Show me: Automatic presentation for visual analysis". With Pat Hanrahan and Chris Stolte. In: IEEE transactions on visualization and computer graphics 13(6).
- 2008. "Graphical histories for visualization: Supporting analysis, communication, and evaluation". With J Heer, C Stolte, M Agrawala. In: IEEE transactions on visualization and computer graphics 14(6).
- 2009. “Information visualization”. With Stuart Card, B Shneiderman. In: Human-computer interaction: Design issues, solutions, and applications 181
- 2013. “Storytelling: The next step for visualization”. With R Kosara. In: Computer 46(5) pp. 44–50 .
