= Margaret Burnett =

American computer scientist

Margaret M. Burnett (born 1949) is a computer scientist specializing in work at the intersection of human computer interaction and software engineering, known for her pioneering work in visual programming languages, end-user software engineering, and gender-inclusive software. She is a Distinguished Professor of Computer Science at Oregon State University,, a member of the CHI Academy, and an ACM Fellow.

== Education and career ==
Burnett was born in 1949, and is originally from Springfield, Illinois. She studied at Miami University of Ohio from 1967 to 1970, brought there in part by their newly established program in computer science but eventually majoring in mathematics. After graduating, she became a software engineer for Procter & Gamble, the first woman hired in a management position at their Ivorydale factory and research center in Cincinnati, Ohio. She left soon after, following her husband to Santa Fe, New Mexico, where she started her own business, and then to Lawrence, Kansas.

In Kansas, she became a student again at the University of Kansas (KU). She earned a master's degree there in 1981, began working as an independent consultant, then started a small consulting business with William Bulgren, a professor at KU, and eventually returned to KU for a Ph.D. in 1987. Her dissertation, Abstraction in the Demand-Driven, Temporal-Assignment, Visual Language Model, concerned visual programming languages and was supervised by Allen L. Ambler.

On completing her doctorate, she became a Computer Science faculty member at Michigan Technological University. In 1993, she moved to Oregon State University's Computer Science Department. She and Cherri M. Pancake (hired the same year), were the first two women to be hired as tenure-track Computer Science faculty at Oregon State.

== Activism ==
As a graduate student at the University of Kansas, Burnett founded a group for the professional women of Lawrence, Kansas to network for each other, the Lawrence Women's Network, which is still active.

In the early 2000s she began developing methods for software engineers to check how gender-inclusive their software is, and she has given keynote addresses in software engineering concerning issues of gender-inclusivity for software and software engineers.

== Recognition ==
In 2016, Burnett became a Distinguished Professor at Oregon State University, and was named to the CHI Academy. She was elected an ACM Fellow in 2017 "for contributions to end-user software engineering, understanding gender biases in software, and broadening participation in computing". Burnett was also given the Anita Borg Institute Women of Vision Award for Technical Leadership in 2023.
