= Gender HCI =

Subfield of human-computer interaction

Gender HCI is a subfield of human–computer interaction (HCI) that focuses on the design and evaluation of interactive systems for humans. The specific emphasis in gender HCI is on variations in how people of different genders interact with computers.

== Examples ==
Gender HCI research has been conducted in the following areas (among others):

- Biases in perceptions of gendered computerized partners
- The effects of confidence and self-efficacy on genders' interactions with software.
- The design of gender-specific software, such as video games created for women.
- The design of display screen sizes and how they affect different genders.
- The design of gender-neutral problem-solving software.

== Overview ==
Gender HCI investigates ways in which attributes of software (or even hardware) can interact with gender differences. As with all of HCI, Gender HCI is a highly interdisciplinary area. Findings from fields such as psychology, computer science, marketing, neuroscience, education, and economics strongly suggest that men and women problem solve, communicate, and process information differently. Gender HCI investigates whether these differences need to be taken into account in the design of software and hardware.

== History ==
The term Gender HCI was coined in 2004 by Laura Beckwith, a PhD candidate at Oregon State University, and her advisor Margaret Burnett. They discovered that, although there had been some activity that could be characterized as Gender HCI work, people did not know about each other's work. The relevant research reports were isolated and scattered about various fields. Since that time, they and others have worked to help researchers know about each other's work and practitioners to be aware of the findings, so as to allow this area to mature as a subarea of HCI.

The following are a brief set of milestones in the history of this emerging subarea.

- 1987: Games designed as "gender neutral" look like games designed for boys. (Chuck Huff).
- 1989: Ethnographic research exploring women, programming, and computers (Sherry Turkle).
- 1995: Gender differences in self-efficacy and attitudes toward computers (Tor Busch).
- 1998: Gender factors in the design of video games (Justine Cassell).
- 2002: Wider displays more beneficial to all users, especially females (Mary Czerwinski, Desney S. Tan, George G. Robertson).
- 2004: The concept Gender HCI made explicit (Laura Beckwith, Margaret Burnett).
- 2006: A research workshop on Gender HCI.

== Selected findings ==
Here are some results from the Gender HCI research conducted to date – ordered from most to least recent, within categories:

1. "Reward Expectations of Gendered Computers."
  - In one experiment, subjects worked on a task with a computerized partner that was named James or Julie. The task was gender-neutral, meaning that it was not directly relevant to being a man or woman. The results showed that subjects behaved the same way toward a computer named James or Julie. Despite these similarities in behavior, subjects estimated that a computer named James would cost them significantly more than one named Julie. The findings show gender shape user perceptions of their computers, which lack the human features that define the characteristic of gender.
2. Confidence-related findings.
  - For spreadsheet problem-solving tasks, (1) female end users had significantly lower self-efficacy than males and (2) women with low self-efficacy were significantly less likely to work effectively with problem-solving features available in the software. In contrast, males' self-efficacy did not impact their effectiveness with these features.
  - In a study of the computer attitudes and self-efficacy of 147 college students, gender differences existed in self-efficacy for complex tasks (such as word processing and spreadsheet software), but not simpler tasks. Also, male students had more experience working with computers and reported more encouragement from parents and friends.
3. Software feature related findings.
  - In spreadsheet problem-solving tasks, female end users were significantly slower to try out unfamiliar features. Females significantly more often agreed with the statement, "I was afraid I would take too long to learn the [untaught feature]." Even if they tried it once, females were significantly less likely to adopt new features for repeated use. For females, unlike for males, self-efficacy predicted the amount of effective feature usage. There was no significant difference in the success of the two genders or in learning how the features worked, implying that females' low self-efficacy about their usage of new features was not an accurate assessment of their problem-solving potential, but rather became a self-fulfilling prophecy.
4. Behavior related findings.
  - In spreadsheet problem-solving tasks, tinkering (playfully experimenting) with features was adopted by males more often than females. While males were comfortable with this behavior, some did it to excess. For females, the amount of tinkering predicted success. Pauses after any action were predictive of better understanding for both genders.
  - Males viewed machines as a challenge, something to be mastered, overcome, and be measured against. They were risk-takers, and they demonstrated this by eagerly trying new techniques and approaches. Females rejected the image of the male hacker as alienating and depersonalizing. Their approach to computers was "soft;" tactile, artistic, and communicative.
5. Hardware interface findings.
  - Larger displays helped reduce the gender gap in navigating virtual environments. With smaller displays, males' performance was better than females'. With larger displays, females' performance improved and males' performance was not negatively affected.
6. Video games findings.
  - Several findings were reported about girls' interests that relate to video games, with interpretations for the video game software industry.
  - Several researchers explored what girls seek in video games, and implications for video game designers. Among the implications were collaboration vs. competition preferences, and use of non-violent rewards versus death and destruction as rewards. These works argue both sides of the question as to whether or not to design games specifically for girls.
7. Other related findings about gender and computers.
  - In a study of the way people interacted with conversational software agents in relation to the sex of the agent, the female virtual agent received many more violent and sexual overtures than either the male one or the gender-free one (a robot).
  - In the home, where many appliances are programmable to some extent, different categories of appliance were found to be more likely to be programmed by men (e.g. entertainment devices) and by women (e.g. kitchen appliances). There is often one member of a household who assumes responsibility for programming a particular device, with a "domestic economy" accounting for this task.
  - Males and females had different perceptions for whether a web page would be appropriate for his/her home country, and further, females more often than males preferred more information on all web pages viewed during a study.
  - Women who entered mathematics, science, and technology careers had high academic and social self-efficacy. Their self-efficacy was based on vicarious experiences and verbal persuasion of significant people around them.
  - Factors affecting low retention of women in computer science majors in college included women's lower previous experience in computing compared to men, their low self-perceived ability, discouragement by the dominant male peer culture, and lack of encouragement from faculty.

== See also ==
- Feminist HCI
- Human–computer interaction
- Self-efficacy
- Topics in human–computer interaction
- Usability
- Usability engineering
