= Diabotical =

- Developer: GD Studio
- Publisher: GD Studio
- Designer: James Harding
- Programmer: "FireFrog"
- Platform: Microsoft Windows
- Release: 3 September 2020
- Genre: Arena first-person shooter

Diabotical is a 2020 multiplayer-only first-person shooter developed by Swedish team GD Studio. It is in the arena FPS genre and features gameplay similar to Quake III Arena and its successors, with a variety of game modes, weapons, and complex movement mechanics. Diabotical uses an engine written from scratch, the "Glitch Engine".

The game entered closed beta on 28 February 2020, with a full release on 3 September 2020. The game is free to play. $250,000 were set aside for esports competitions in the game's first year.

A sequel named Diabotical Rogue was released in early access on June 4, 2024. It is a class-based first-person shooter featuring roguelite elements in the form of randomized weapon loadouts and upgrades.
