= George G. Robertson =

American information visualization expert

George G. Robertson is an American information visualization expert and senior researcher, Visualization and Interaction (VIBE) Research Group, Microsoft Research. With Stuart K. Card, Jock D. Mackinlay and others he invented a number of Information Visualization techniques.

== Biography ==
Robertson has worked as a faculty member of the Computer Science Department at Carnegie-Mellon University, a senior scientist at Thinking Machines, and a senior scientist at Bolt Beranek and Newman. Before his current position at Microsoft he was principal scientist at Xerox PARC. Since 1996 he is a principal researcher in the Visualization and Interaction group at Microsoft Research.

He is an ACM Fellow and manages a project on 3D User Interfaces and Information Visualization. He is associate editor of the Journal of Information Visualization.

Robertson's research interests are "user interfaces, 3D interactive animation, 3D graphics, information visualization, intelligent information access, multimedia, and hypermedia", see also: Connection Machine and Gender HCI

== Publications ==
Articles, a selection:

- 1972. "XCRIBL - A Hardcopy Scan Line Graphics System for Document Generation". With Raj Reddy, W. Broadley, Lee D. Erman, R. Johnsson, J. Newcomer, and J. Wright. In: Inf. Process. Lett. 1(6): 246-251.
- 1978. "An Extensible File System for Hydra". With Guy T. Almes. In: ICSE 1978: 288-294.
- 1981. "Accent: A Communication Oriented Network Operating System Kernel". With: Richard F. Rashid, in: SOSP 1981: 64-75.
- 1987. "Parallel Implementation of Genetic Algorithms in a Classifier Rystem". in: Proceedings of the 2nd International Conference on Genetic Algorithms, July 1987: 140-147.
- 1988. "Population Size in classifier Systems". in: ML 1988: 142-152.
- 1989. "The cognitive coprocessor architecture for interactive user interfaces". With S. K. Card, and J. D. Mackinlay. In: Proceedings of the ACM SIGGRAPH Symposium on User Interface Software and Technology, pages 10–18. ACM Press, Nov 1989.
- 1991. "Cone Trees: Animated 3D Visualizations of Hierarchical Information". With Jock D. Mackinlay and Stuart K. Card. In: Robertson, Scott P., Olson, Gary M. and Olson, Judith S. (eds.) Proceedings of the ACM CHI 91 Human Factors in Computing Systems Conference April 28 - June 5, 1991, New Orleans, Louisiana. pp. 189–194.
- 1993. "Information Visualization Using 3D Interactive Animation". With Stuart K. Card, and Jock D. Mackinlay. In: Communications of the ACM, 36(4), April 1993. pp. 57–71.
- 1993. "The document lens". With J. D. Mackinlay. In: Proceedings of the ACM Symposium on User Interface Software and Technology. ACM Press, Nov 1993.
