= AssaultCube =

2008 video game

- Developer: Rabid Viper Productions
- Engine: Cube Engine
- Platforms: Windows, Linux, macOS, Android
- Release: November 21, 2008
- Genre: First-person shooter

AssaultCube, formerly ActionCube, is an open source first-person shooter video game, based on Cube and using the Cube Engine. Although the main focus of AssaultCube is multiplayer online gaming, a single-player mode consists of computer-controlled bots.

AssaultCube utilises efficient bandwidth usage, allowing the game to be run with connection speeds as low as 56kbit/s. It can run on older computer hardware as well.

AssaultCube is available for free on Microsoft Windows, Linux, macOS, FreeBSD and Android. The game engine is free software, but parts of the accompanying game media, such as the graphics, are released under non-free licenses, the CC BY-NC-SA Creative Commons license, which makes the overall game freeware.

== Gameplay ==
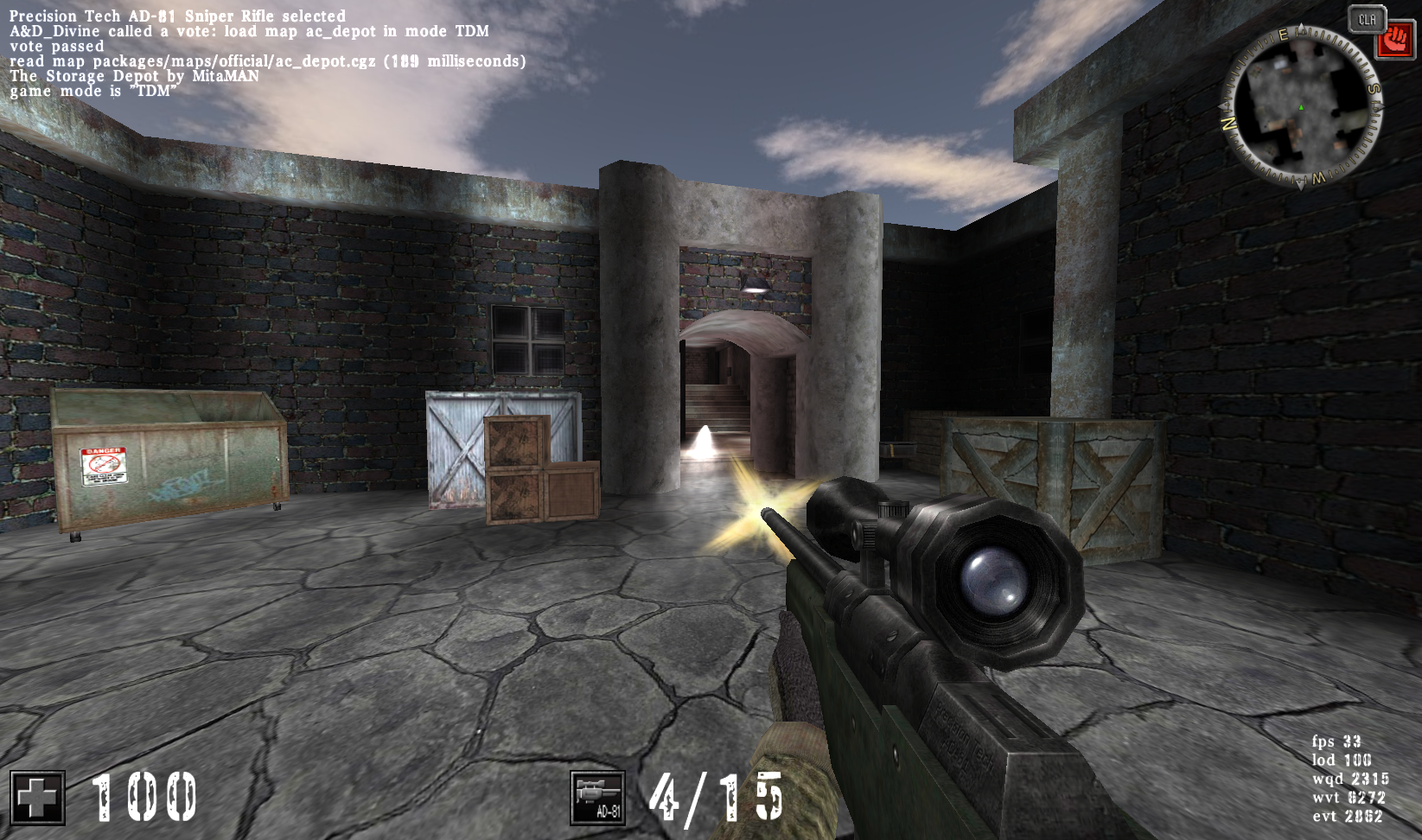
Gameplay screenshot of ac_depot

AssaultCube was designed to be more realistic and team-oriented than Cube while keeping Cube's distinctive fast-paced gameplay. In comparison to other games, AssaultCube is slower-paced than Quake but faster-paced than Counter-Strike. There are two different teams in AssaultCube, called the "Cubers Liberations Army" (CLA) and the "Rabid Viper Special Forces" (RVSF).

AssaultCube retains a movement bug from Cube that allows players to utilize straferunning to move at a faster speed. This was left intentionally unfixed by the developers because it was considered an enjoyable feature of Cube, similar to bunny hopping in Quake.

Another feature of the game is the potential for using the recoil of the weapons (which pushes one backwards) to reach and perform moves that were previously impossible. This was also included intentionally, allowing players to achieve faster movement and jump higher. This feature was inherited from Cube, though it was absent in the original release of AssaultCube.

AssaultCube's weapons are all fictional and fill the basic niches of a modern first-person shooter: the assault rifle, sub-machine gun, sniper rifle, carbine, shotgun, pistol, dual pistols and knife.

Despite its simplistic graphics and gameplay, AssaultCube maintained a consistent player base of hundreds of players, with over 60 user-run servers online at any given time around 2009.

AssaultCube had several gaming clans, some of which participate in organized tournaments.

AssaultCube's engine is an improved version of Cube. These improvements include several features from the Cube 2 Engine, such as more menu features and the possibility to set variables in scripts with the syntax variable = value (the old syntax, alias variable value, still works).

=== Mapping ===
AssaultCube retains an in-game mapping feature from the original Cube game, resulting in a variety of custom maps. The diverse nature of the Cube engine's mapping feature allows for creativity and almost endless possibilities for custom maps. Another aspect of AssaultCube is the ease at which custom maps can be shared. These created maps can be played online fairly easily if they comply with quality pre-requisites.

=== Game modes ===
AssaultCube has over a dozen different gamemodes, such as deathmatch, capture the flag and variations thereof.

== Development ==
AssaultCube started out as ActionCube in July 2004 by a few members of the Cube community. The first official release was in November 2006. The plan was to create an entirely new game incorporating Cube's simplicity and movement style in a more realistic environment.

In May 2007, ActionCube was renamed to AssaultCube due to a request from the developers of Action Quake.

Version 1.0 was released on November 21, 2008. Version 1.2.0.2 was released on November 10, 2013. The game received no updates until version 1.3.0.0, which was released on December 4, 2021.

The latest version is 1.3.0.2, released on April 1, 2022.

== Reception ==
AssaultCube, then under the name ActionCube, was named "Free Game of the Month" by the German video game magazine PC Action in February 2007. AssaultCube was downloaded between 2006 and March 2017 alone over SourceForge 7,456,000 times.

The game was forked into a version with a built-in gaming portal named ActionFPS in 2017. Features include an authentication system and a match client.

== See also ==
- List of freeware first-person shooters
- List of open source games
