= Eileen Scanlon =

Eileen Scanlon OBE FAcSS
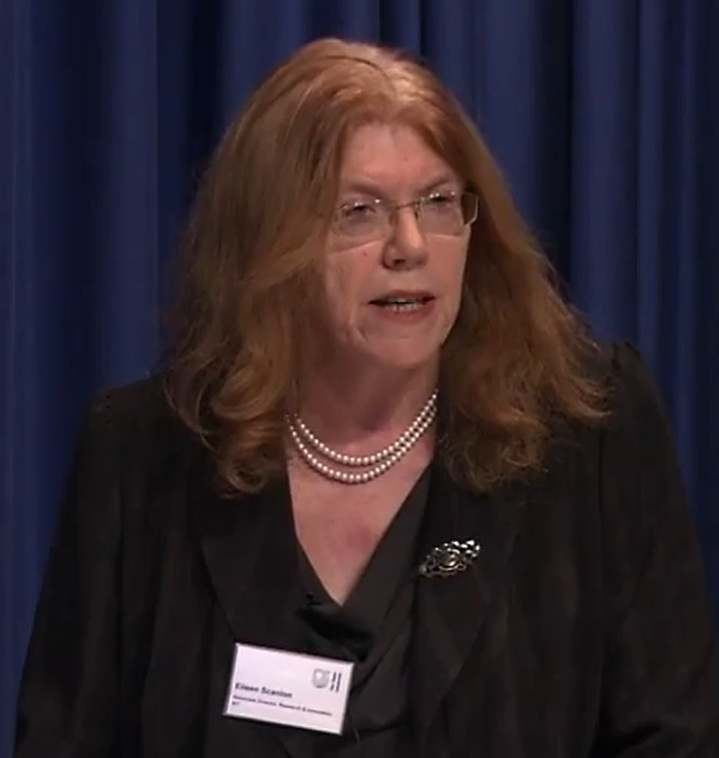
- Scanlon in 2015
- Born: 1951 (age 74–75)
- Education: University of Glasgow; Open University (PhD)
- Scientific career
- Fields: Education; Computing
- Workplaces: Open University
- Thesis: Modelling physics problem solving (1989)
- Doctoral students: Ann Blandford
- Website: iet.open.ac.uk/people/eileen.scanlon

Eileen Scanlon OBE FAcSS (born 1951) is a British academic who is Regius Professor of Open Education at the Open University.

== Early life and education ==
Scanlon was born in 1951. She is a graduate of the University of Glasgow and the Open University.

== Career and research ==
In 2004, Scanlon became co-director of the Centre for Research in Education and Educational Technology (CREET) at the Open University. She directed the Computer Assisted Learning Research Group for many years and has worked on a range of educational technology research and development projects, many of them focussing on science learning. Her current interests include education, computing, mobile learning for formal and informal learning of science, and developing pedagogies for technology enhanced learning.

In January 2013, she was appointed to the newly established Regius Professorship in Open Education at the Open University.

=== Awards and honours ===
In the 2016 Birthday Honours, Scanlon was appointed Officer of the Order of the British Empire (OBE) "for services to education". In 2016, she was elected a Fellow of the Academy of Social Sciences (FAcSS).
