= Reflex (disambiguation) =

A reflex is an involuntary movement in response to a stimulus.

Reflex also may refer to:

== Music ==
- "The Reflex" (1984), single by Duran Duran
- Reflex (group), Russian band
- Re-Flex, British band
- Reflex Records

== Software ==
- ReFLEX, wireless paging protocol
- Borland Reflex, database management
- Reflex (building design software), successor to Sonata

== Other ==
- Reflex (game show) on BBC One
- Reflex (linguistics), an element of a language that developed from an earlier form
- Reflex (magazine), Czech weekly
- Reflex (novel) by Steven Gould
- Reflex, a trade name of mirtazapine
- Reflex Arena
- Tony Reflex (born 1963), American musician
- "Reflexes", a song by Joe Morris from Flip and Spike
- Operation Reflex Strategic Air Command overseas alert program 1957-1965

== See also ==
- Rephlex Records
