= Reflex Arena =

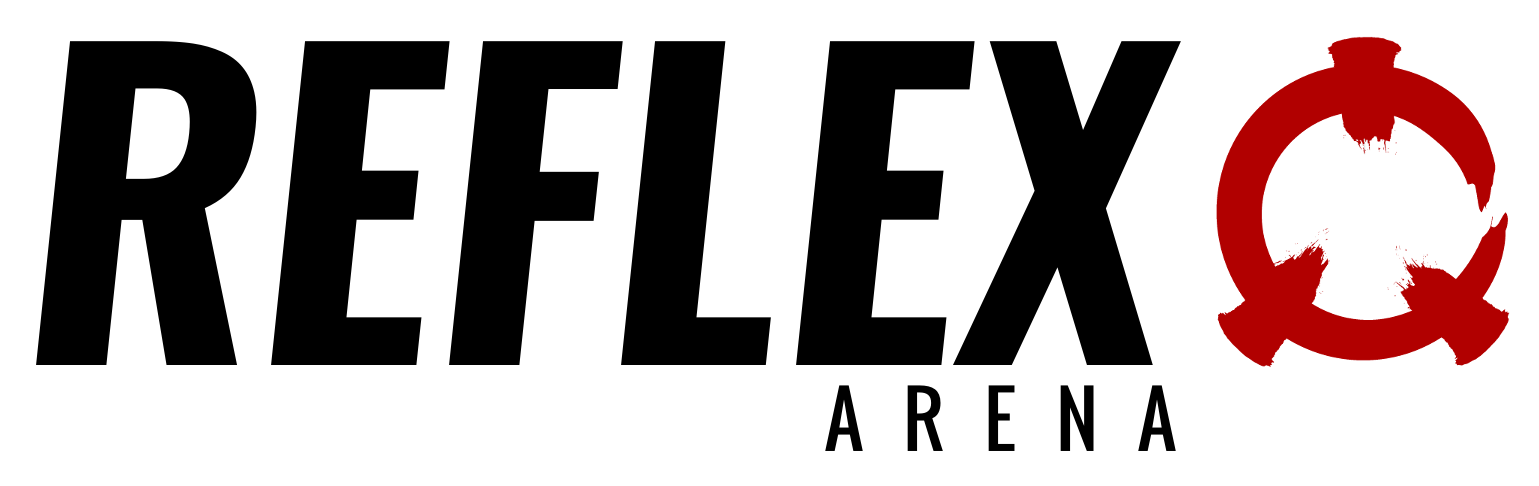
- Developer: Turbo Pixel Studios
- Publisher: Turbo Pixel Studios
- Designers: Dave Jones; Ben Darling
- Programmer: Phil Brown
- Artists: Ben Darling; Ben Southall
- Engine: Reflex Engine
- Platform: Windows
- Release: 8 March 2017
- Genre: First-person shooter
- Mode: Multiplayer

Reflex Arena (colloquially known as Reflex) is a first-person arena shooter video game, developed by Turbo Pixel Studios and released onto Steam's Early Access program on 4 November 2014, and launched out of Early Access on 8 March 2017. It is an arena FPS that is heavily influenced by the Challenge ProMode Arena mod for Quake III Arena. Players must navigate arena-like levels and fight other players using a focused set of situational weapons. Reflex uses an engine built from scratch specifically for the arena FPS genre and features many skill-based movement features, including strafe-jumping, rocket-jumping, and multi-jumping.

Two players using a variety of weapons in combat

== Development ==
Originally titled Reflex, the game was developed by independent Melbourne-based video game studio Turbo Pixel Studios. The game was placed onto Kickstarter on 20 September 2014 where it was subsequently cancelled due to a lack of funding, only acquiring $81,000 of the requested $360,000. Due to the cancellation, Reflex Arena entered the Steam Greenlight process, where it was "greenlit" by the community and then placed on the Early Access program, allowing the developers to sell the game during its early development cycle. The game left Early Access on 8 March 2017.

== See also ==
- Quake Champions
