= Platinum Arts Sandbox =

2007 video game creation tool

- Developer(s): Michael Tomaino, Kevin Meyer
- Initial release: June 4, 2007; 17 years ago
- Stable release: 2.8.2 / 19 January 2013; 12 years ago
- Operating system: Microsoft Windows, Linux, FreeBSD, Mac OS X
- Type: game engine

Platinum Arts Sandbox is a video game programming tool. The tool was developed by Michael Tomaino and Kevin Meyer.

== Features in media ==
- PBS/WMHT Games in Education Conference
- Moddb.com Top 100 Mod/Game of the Year 2008
- Many various Moddb.com interviews and features
- Slashdot.org Article - Involving Kids In Free Software Through Games?
- Podcast interview with Michael Tomaino
