= Socially relevant computing =

Socially relevant computing (SRC) is a unique paradigm in computing introduced by the researchers at the University at Buffalo, Rice University and Microsoft Research. It focuses on the use of computation to solve problems that students are most passionate about. It presents computer science as a cutting-edge technological discipline that empowers them to solve problems of personal interest (socially relevant with a "little s"), as well as problems that are important to society at large (socially relevant with a "capital s").

SRC emphasizes the use of computation for solving problems of personal and societal interest to students. It offers opportunities to demonstrate that computer science is a mainstream endeavor and that it offers conceptual and technological tools for solving meaningful, real-world problems. Courses in this new framework help students identify and model tasks, and design and implement computational solutions that show deep understanding of their embedding in the real world. At the very least, SRC offers interesting examples to illustrate foundational concepts in computer science. By emphasizing problem-solving, and by giving students practice in recognizing needs and engineering solutions to them via computation, SRC at its finest promises to create a more entrepreneurial, as well as a more broadly educated computer scientist.
