= Bonnie E. John =

American cognitive psychologist (born 1955)

Dr. Bonnie E. John
- Born: September 10, 1955 (age 70)
- Education: Carnegie Mellon University (PhD & M.S.); Stanford University (M.Eng.); The Cooper Union (B.Eng.)
- Known for: CPM-GOMS
- Awards: CHI Academy; Thomas A. Wasow Visiting Scholar in Symbolic Systems, Stanford University
- Scientific career
- Fields: Cognitive psychology Human-Computer Interaction
- Workplaces: The Cooper Union; IBM Thomas J. Watson Research Center; Carnegie Mellon University
- Doctoral advisor: Allen Newell

Bonnie E. John (born September 10, 1955) is an American cognitive psychologist who studies human–computer interaction, predictive human performance modeling, and the relationship between usability and software architecture. She was a founding member of the Human-Computer Interaction Institute at Carnegie Mellon University, a research staff member at IBM's Thomas J. Watson Research Center, and the director of computation and innovation at The Cooper Union.

== Background ==
A founding member of the Human-Computer Interaction Institute, established in 1993 at Carnegie Mellon University, she was previously an assistant professor in the Computer Science Department at Carnegie Mellon. She earned her Ph.D. in cognitive psychology at Carnegie Mellon University in 1988. John has published technical papers in the area of human–computer interaction. She was elected to the CHI Academy in 2005. She was also a founding associate editor for ACM Transactions on Computer Human Interaction (TOCHI). John was a research staff member at IBM's Thomas J. Watson Research Center. She returned to her alma mater, The Cooper Union, as the director of computation and innovation in December 2014.

== Research ==
John researches techniques to improve the design of computer systems with respect to their usefulness and usability. She has investigated the effectiveness and usability of several HCI techniques and produced new techniques for bringing usability concerns to the design process (e.g., CPM-GOMS and Usability-Supporting Architectural patterns).
