= Red Eclipse =

2011 video game

- Developers: Quinton Reeves, Lee Salzman, various contributors
- Platforms: Microsoft Windows, Linux, macOS
- Release: March 15, 2011
- Genre: First-person shooter
- Modes: Single-player, multiplayer

Red Eclipse is an open-source first-person shooter that is forked from Cube 2: Sauerbraten. Like the original Cube 2, it features multiplayer gameplay as well as in-game level editing, but with improved graphics and a focus on parkour movement. The game is free and open-source software, released under the zlib license, and developed by an open community of contributors. Its content is free, and released under a CC BY-SA license.

== Gameplay ==
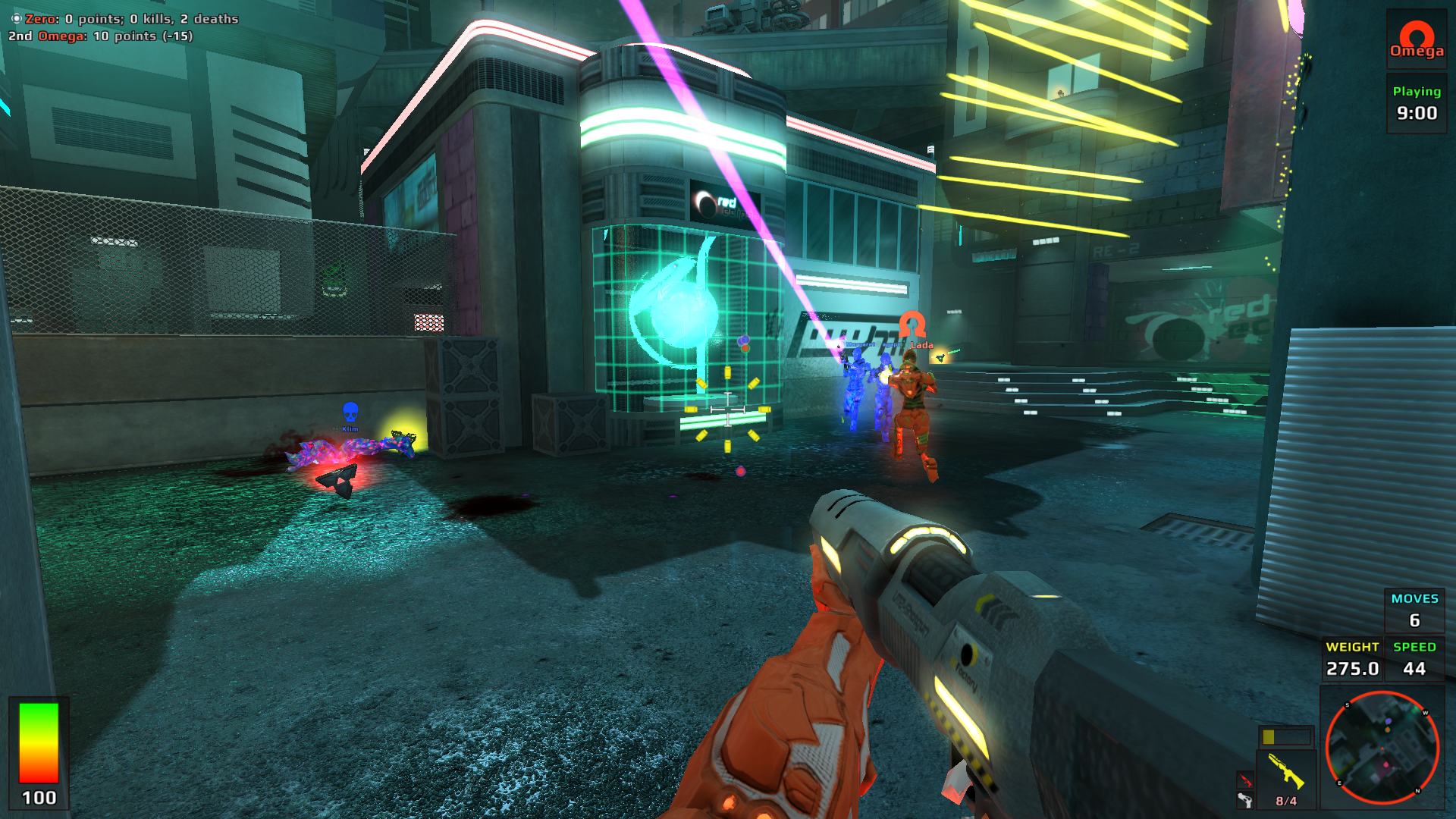
In-game screenshot; the game is played in the default mode on the map Edge.

Red Eclipse is a multiplayer first-person arena shooter, similar to Cube 2: Sauerbraten, with a style of play comparable to Quake III Arena or Unreal Tournament. Players fight in two randomly assigned teams — Alpha (Blue) and Omega (Red) — which can be changed with mutators. Game modes include: Deathmatch (kill to score), Capture the Flag, Defend and Control (players must secure control points to win), Bomber Ball (a bomb must be brought into the enemy goal before it explodes), Race (players compete for the number of laps), as well as online cooperative map editing. As in Cube 2, each mode can be further modified with several mutators, such as FFA (Free-For-All, i.e. players fight for themselves) and Instagib (all hits are lethal, and players spawn only with a rifle). Unlike Cube 2, Red Eclipse features parkour movement, such as vaulting or running along walls.

== Development ==
Red Eclipse was branched from the defunct Blood Frontier project, itself a fork of Cube 2: Sauerbraten that began development in 2007. The first stable release of Red Eclipse, version 1.0 ("Ides Edition"), debuted on March 15, 2011. The game engine is written in C++ and uses SDL with OpenGL as its cross-platform graphics API. It builds and expands upon established concepts of Cube 2, and uses the same octree geometry model to enable real-time, WYSIWYG editing. Red Eclipse 1.3 in 2012 introduced two new modes: "King of the Hill" and "Coop".

Version 1.6, released on December 21, 2017 and dubbed "Sunset Edition", was the last version to use the old rendering engine, before the game started using parts of the engine of Tesseract (another fork of Cube 2) for the next major release. Tesseract's graphical improvements allowed Red Eclipse to use more advanced rendering and lighting techniques — most notably deferred shading, better shadow-mapping, and support for reflection and refraction. Red Eclipse 2.0 ("Jupiter Edition"), the first version to use the new engine, was released on Steam in December 2019.

== Reception ==
In 2013, Red Eclipse was used by researchers of the University of Illinois at Urbana-Champaign and Microsoft Research for the creation of IllumiRoom, a project to create an augmented television screen with projectors. The researchers noted in their IllumiRoom paper for the CHI 2013 that access to Red Eclipse's source code enabled a "rich, interactive experience".

== See also ==
- List of freeware first-person shooters
- List of open-source video games
