= Human processor model =

Cognitive modeling method

Human processor model or MHP (Model Human Processor) is a cognitive modeling method developed by Stuart K. Card, Thomas P. Moran, & Allen Newell (1983) used to calculate how long it takes to perform a certain task. Other cognitive modeling methods include parallel design, GOMS, and keystroke-level model (KLM).

Cognitive modeling is one way to evaluate the usability of a product. This method uses experimental times to calculate cognitive and motor processing time. The value of the human processor model is that it allows a system designer to predict the performance with respect to time it takes a person to complete a task without performing experiments. Other modeling methods include inspection methods, inquiry methods, prototyping methods, and testing methods.

The standard definition for MHP is: The MHP draws an analogy between the processing and storage areas of a computer, with the perceptual, motor, cognitive and memory areas of the computer user.

The human processor model uses the cognitive, perceptual, and motor processors along with the visual image, working memory, and long term memory storages. A diagram is shown below. Each processor has a cycle time and each memory has a decay time. These values are also included below. By following the connections diagrammed below, along with the associated cycle or decay times, the time it takes a user to perform a certain task can be calculated. Studies into this field were initially done by Stuart K. Card, Thomas P. Moran, & Allen Newell in 1983. Current studies in the field include work to distinguish process times in older adults by Tiffany Jastrembski and Neil Charness (2007

== How to calculate ==
The calculations depend on the ability to break down every step of a task into the basic process level. The more detailed the analysis, the more accurate the model will be to predict human performance. The method for determining processes can be broken down into the following steps.

- Write out main steps based on: a working prototype, simulation, step by step walk-through of all steps
- Clearly identify the specific task and method to accomplish that task
- For each final step identify sub-levels down to a basic process (in the diagram or chart below)
- Convert into pseudo code (writing out methods for each step)
- List all assumptions (will be helpful as multiple iterations are completed)
- Determine time of each operation (based on the table below)
- Determine if operation times should be adjusted (slower for elderly, disability, unfamiliarity, etc.)
- Sum up execution times
- Iterate as needed and check with prototyping if possible

Parameter	Mean	Range
Eye movement time	230 ms	70–700 ms
Decay half-life of visual image storage	200 ms	90–1000 ms
Visual Capacity	17 letters	7–17 letters
Decay half-life of auditory storage	1500 ms	900–3500 ms
Auditory Capacity	5 letters	4.4–6.2 letters
Perceptual processor cycle time	100 ms	50–200 ms
Cognitive processor cycle time	70 ms	25–170 ms
Motor processor cycle time	70 ms	30–100 ms
Effective working memory capacity	7 chunks	5–9 chunks
Pure working memory capacity	3 chunks	2.5–4.2 chunks
Decay half-life of working memory	7 sec	5–226 sec
Decay half-life of 1 chunk working memory	73 sec	73–226 sec
Decay half-life of 3 chunks working memory	7 sec	5–34 sec

== Potential uses ==
Once complete, the calculations can then be used to determine the probability of a user remembering an item that may have been encountered in the process. The following formula can be used to find the probability: P = e^{-K*t} where K is the decay constant for the respective memory in question (working or long term) and t is the amount of time elapsed (with units corresponding to that of K). The probability could then be used to determine whether or not a user would be likely to recall an important piece of information they were presented with while doing an activity.

It is important to deduce beforehand whether the user would be able to repeat the vital information throughout time t, as this has a negative impact on the working memory if they cannot. For example, if a user is reading lines of text and is presented with an important phone number in that text, they may not be able to repeat the number if they have to continue to read. This would cause the user’s working memory’s decay time to be smaller, thus reducing their probability of recall.

== See also ==
- Working memory
- GOMS
- KLM (human-computer interaction)
- Human reliability
