= Stuart Card =

American computer researcher

Stuart K. Card (born December 21, 1943) is an American researcher and retired senior research fellow at Xerox PARC. He is considered to be one of the pioneers of applying human factors in human–computer interaction. With Jock D. Mackinlay, George G. Robertson and others he invented a number of information visualization techniques. He holds numerous patents in user interfaces and visual analysis.

== Biography ==
Card received a B.A. in physics from Oberlin College in 1966.

Card completed his Ph.D. in psychology in 1978 under the supervision of Allen Newell at Carnegie Mellon University. His doctoral work brought together experimental psychology, information-processing theory, and the emerging study of human interaction with computers. In his dissertation, Studies in the Psychology of Computer Text Editing Systems, Card treated computer text editing as a rigorous object of scientific analysis, modeling user behavior in terms of goals, operators, methods, and selection rules. This work helped establish the conceptual foundations of modern human-computer interaction and foreshadowed the influential research Card would later carry out at Xerox PARC later in his career.

After his Ph.D., he started working as an adjunct faculty member at Stanford University in the late 1960s. Since 1974 he had been working at PARC and was the Area Manager of the User Interface Research group. He retired from PARC in 2010 but has been a consulting professor in Stanford University's Computer Science department.

Card received several awards. In 2000 he was awarded the CHI Lifetime Achievement Award from the Association for Computing Machinery's SIGCHI, and became Fellow of the Association for Computing Machinery. In 2001 he was elected to the CHI Academy. In 2007, he was elected a member of the National Academy of Engineering, and was awarded The Franklin Institute's Bower Award and Prize for Achievement in Science. On May 26, 2008, Card was made an Honorary Doctor of Science by Oberlin College.

== Work ==
Stuart Card's study of input devices led to the Fitts's law characterization of the computer mouse and was a major factor leading to the mouse's commercial introduction by Xerox, most notably in the Alto and Star projects, some of the very earliest GUI systems employing a desktop metaphor.

The 1983 book The Psychology of Human–Computer Interaction, which he co-wrote with Thomas P. Moran and Allen Newell, became seminal work in the HCI field. Further research into the theoretical characterizations of human–machine interaction led to developments including "the Model Human Processor, the GOMS theory of user interaction, information foraging theory, and statistical descriptions of Internet use". In the new millennium his research has been focusing on developing a "supporting science of human–information interaction and visual-semantic prototypes to aid sense making".

== Publications ==
Card has written three books and more than 70 papers, and holds 22 patents.

- 1983. The Psychology of Human-Computer Interaction. With Thomas P. Moran and Allen Newell.
- 1990. Human Performance Models for Computer-Aided Engineering. Edited with J.I. Elkind, J. Hochberg and B.M. Heuy. San Diego, CA : Academic Press.
- 1996. IEEE Symposium on Information Visualization ’96 : proceedings, October 28–29, 1996, San Francisco, California. Edited with Stephen G. Eick and Nahum Gershon. Los Alamitos, Calif. : IEEE Computer Society.
- 1999. Readings in information visualization : using vision to think. With Jock D. Mackinlay and Ben Shneiderman.
