= Human information interaction =

Human-information interaction (HII) is the formal term for information behavior research in archival science; the term was invented by Nahum Gershon in 1995. HII is not transferable from analog to digital research because nonprofessional researchers greatly emphasize the need for further elaboration of context and scope finding aid elements. Researchers in HII take on many tasks, including helping to design information systems from a biological perspective that conform to the requirements of different segments of society, along with other behaviour intended to improve interaction between humans and information systems. HII is generally considered to be multi-disciplinary as different disciplines have different viewpoints on these interactions and their consequences. HII is considered especially important due to humanity's dependence on information and the technology needed to access it.
