= Focus-plus-context screen =

Type of display device

The original focus-plus-context screen prototype consisted of an 18" LCD screen embedded in a 5' front-projected screen. The callout shows the different resolutions of focus and context area.

A focus-plus-context screen is a specialized type of display device that consists of one or more high-resolution "focus" displays embedded into a larger low-resolution "context" display. Image content is displayed across all display regions, such that the scaling of the image is preserved, while its resolution varies across the display regions.

The original focus-plus-context screen prototype consisted of an 18"/45 cm LCD screen embedded in a 5'/150 cm front-projected screen. Alternative designs have been proposed that achieve the mixed-resolution effect by combining two or more projectors with different focal lengths

While the high-resolution area of the original prototype was located at a fixed location, follow-up projects have obtained a movable focus area by using a Tablet PC.

Patrick Baudisch is the inventor of focus-plus-context screens (2000, while at Xerox PARC)

== Advantages ==
- Allows users to leverage their foveal and their peripheral vision
- Cheaper to manufacture than a display that is high-resolution across the entire display surface
- Displays entirety and details of large images in a single view. Unlike approaches that combine entirety and details in software (fisheye views), focus-plus-context screens do not introduce distortion.

== Disadvantages ==
- In existing implementations, the focus display is either fixed or moving it is physically demanding
