= Thomas P. Moran =

Thomas P. Moran is a Distinguished Engineer at the IBM Almaden Research Center in San Jose, California. He has been active in the field of human computer interaction for a very long time. In 1983 the book he wrote along with Stuart Card and Allen Newell The Psychology of Human-Computer Interaction was published. It became a very influential book in the field, partly for introducing the Goals, Operators, Methods, and Selection rules (GOMS) model.

He founded and has been Editor-in-Chief of Human-Computer Interaction, one of the leading journals of the field.

He is one of the first CHI Academy members and won ACM SIGCHI's 2004 Life Time Achievement Award. In 2003 he was inducted as a Fellow of the Association for Computing Machinery. In 2008 he was elected as a Fellow of AAAS.

Unrelated to the other famous engineer, Thomas D. Moran.
