= Urban computing =

Urban computing is an interdisciplinary field which pertains to the study and application of computing technology in urban areas. This involves the application of wireless networks, sensors, computational power, and data to improve the quality of densely populated areas. Urban computing is the technological framework for smart cities.

The term "urban computing" was first introduced by Eric Paulos at the 2004 UbiComp conference and in his paper The Familiar Stranger co-authored with Elizabeth Goodman. Although closely tied to the field of urban informatics, Marcus Foth differentiates the two in his preface to Handbook of Research on Urban Informatics by saying that urban computing, urban technology, and urban infrastructure focus more on technological dimensions whereas urban informatics focuses on the social and human implications of technology in cities.

Within the domain of computer science, urban computing draws from the domains of wireless and sensor networks, information science, and human-computer interaction. Urban computing uses many of the paradigms introduced by ubiquitous computing in that collections of devices are used to gather data about the urban environment to help improve the quality of life for people affected by cities. What further differentiates urban computing from traditional remote sensing networks is the variety of devices, inputs, and human interaction involved. In traditional sensor networks, devices are often purposefully built and specifically deployed for monitoring certain phenomenon such as temperature, noise, and light. As an interdisciplinary field, urban computing also has practitioners and applications in fields including civil engineering, anthropology, public history, health care, urban planning, and energy, among others.

== Applications and examples ==
Urban computing is a process of acquisition, integration, and analysis of big and heterogeneous data generated by a diversity of sources in urban spaces, such as sensors, devices, vehicles, buildings, and human, to tackle the major issues that cities face. Urban computing connects unobtrusive and ubiquitous sensing technologies, advanced data management and analytics models, and novel visualization methods, to create win-win-win solutions that improve urban environment, human life quality, and city operation systems.

— Yu Zheng, Urban Computing with Big Data

=== Cultural archiving ===
Cities are more than a collection of places and people - places are continually reinvented and re-imagined by the people occupying them. As such, the prevalence of computing in urban spaces leads people to supplement their physical reality with what is virtually available. Toward this end, researchers engaged in ethnography, collective memory, and public history have leveraged urban computing strategies to introduce platforms that enable people to share their interpretation of the urban environment. Examples of such projects include CLIO—an urban computing system that came out of the Collective City Memory of Oulu study—which "allows people to share personal memories, context annotate them and relate them with city landmarks, thus creating the collective city memory." and the Cleveland Historical project which aims to create a shared history of the city by allowing people to contribute stories through their own digital devices.

=== Energy consumption ===
Energy consumption and pollution throughout the world is heavily impacted by urban transportation. In an effort to better utilize and update current infrastructures, researchers have used urban computing to better understand gas emissions by conducting field studies using GPS data from a sample of vehicles, refueling data from gas stations, and self-reporting online participants. From this, knowledge of the density and speed of traffic traversing a city's road network can be used to suggest cost-efficient driving routes, and identify road segments where gas has been significantly wasted. Information and predictions of pollution density gathered in this way could also be used to generate localized air quality alerts. Additionally, these data could produce estimates of gas stations' wait times to suggest more efficient stops, as well as give a geographic view of the efficiency of gas station placement.

Machine learning can also help cities manage energy consumption more efficiently. Machine learning technologies allow cities to predict future energy needs and make sustainable decisions. Papa et al. (2025) used recurrent neural networks to forecast natural gas consumption in Ljubljana, Slovenia, up to 60 hours ahead, helping improve efficient energy allocation.

=== Health ===
Smart phones, tablets, smart watches, and other mobile computing devices can provide information beyond simple communication and entertainment. In regards to public and personal health, organizations like the Centers for Disease Control and Prevention(CDC) and World Health Organization (WHO) have taken to Twitter and other social media platforms, to provide rapid dissemination of disease outbreaks, medical discoveries, and other news. Beyond simply tracking the spread of disease, urban computing can even help predict it. A study by Jeremy Ginsberg et al. discovered that flu-related search queries serve as a reliable indicator of a future outbreak, thus allowing for the tracking of flu outbreaks based on the geographic location of such flu-related searches. This discovery spurred a collaboration between the CDC and Google to create a map of predicted flu outbreaks based on this data.

Urban computing can also be used to track and predict pollution in certain areas. Research involving the use of artificial neural networks (ANN) and conditional random fields (CRF) has shown that air pollution for a large area can be predicted based on the data from a small number of air pollution monitoring stations. These findings can be used to track air pollution and to prevent the adverse health effects in cities already struggling with high pollution. On days when air pollution is especially high, for example, there could be a system in place to alert residents to particularly dangerous areas.

=== Social Interaction ===
Mobile computing platforms can be used to facilitate social interaction. In the context of urban computing, the ability to place proximity beacons in the environment, the density of population, and infrastructure available enables digitally facilitated interaction. Paulos and Goodman's paper The Familiar Stranger introduces several categories of interaction ranging from family to strangers and interactions ranging from personal to in passing. Social interactions can be facilitated by purpose-built devices, proximity aware applications, and "participatory" applications. These applications can use a variety techniques for users to identify where they are ranging from "checking in" to proximity detection, to self-identification. Examples of geographically aware applications include Yik Yak, an application that facilitates anonymous social interaction based on proximity of other users, Ingress which uses an augmented reality game to encourage users to interact with the area around them as well as each other, and Foursquare, which provides recommendations about services to users based on a specified location.

=== Transportation ===
One of the major application areas of urban computing is to improve private and public transportation in a city. The primary sources of data are floating car data (data about where cars are at a given moment). This includes individual GPS's, taxi GPS's, WiFi signals, loop sensors, and (for some applications) user input. Urban computing can help select better driving routes, which is important for applications like Waze, Google Maps, and trip planning. Wang et al. built a system to get real-time travel time estimates. They solve the problems: one, not all road segments will have data from GPS in the last 30 minutes or ever; two, some paths will be covered by several car records, and it's necessary to combine those records to create the most accurate estimate of travel time; and three, a city can have tens of thousands of road segments and an infinite amount of paths to be queried, so providing an instantaneous real time estimate must be scalable. They used various techniques and tested it out on 32670 taxis over two months in Beijing, and accurately estimated travel time to within 25 seconds of error per kilometer.

Bicycle counters are an example of computing technology to count the number of cyclists at a certain spot in order to help urban planning with reliable data.

Uber is an on-demand taxi-like service where users can request rides with their smartphone. By using the data of the active riders and drivers, Uber can price discriminate based on the current rider/driver ratio. This lets them earn more money than they would without "surge pricing," and helps get more drivers out on the street in unpopular working hours.

Urban computing can also improve public transportation cheaply. A University of Washington group developed OneBusAway, which uses public bus GPS data to provide real-time bus information to riders. Placing displays at bus stops to give information is expensive, but developing several interfaces (apps, website, phone response, SMS) to OneBusAway was comparatively cheap. Among surveyed OneBusAway users, 92% were more satisfied, 91% waited less, and 30% took more trips.

Making decisions on transportation policy can also be aided with urban computing. London's Cycle Hire system is a heavily used bicycle-sharing system run by their transit authority. Originally, it required users to have a membership. They changed it to not require a membership after a while, and analyzed data of when and where bikes were rented and returned, to see what areas were active and what trends changed. They found that removing membership was a good decision that increased weekday commutes somewhat and heavily increased weekend usage. Based on the patterns and characteristics of a bicycle sharing system, the implications for data-driven decision supports have been studied for transforming urban transportation to be more sustainable.

=== Environment ===
Urban computing has a lot of potential to improve urban quality of life by improving the environment people live in, such as by raising air quality and reducing noise pollution. Many chemicals that are undesirable or poisonous are polluting the air, such as PM 2.5, PM 10, and carbon monoxide. Many cities measure air quality by setting up a few measurement stations across the city, but these stations are too expensive to cover the entire city. Because air quality is complex, it's difficult to infer the quality of air in between two measurement stations.

Various ways of adding more sensors to the cityscape have been researched, including Copenhagen wheels (sensors mounted on bike wheels and powered by the rider) and car-based sensors. While these work for carbon monoxide and carbon dioxide, aerosol measurement stations aren't portable enough to move around.

There are also attempts to infer the unknown air quality all across the city from just the samples taken at stations, such as by estimating car emissions from floating car data. Zheng et al. built a model using machine learning and data mining called U-Air. It uses historical and real-time air data, meteorology, traffic flow, human mobility, road networks, and points of interest, which are fed to artificial neural networks and conditional random fields to be processed. Their model is a significant improvement over previous models of citywide air quality.

Chet et al. developed a system to monitor air quality indoors, which were deployed internally by Microsoft in China. The system is based in the building's HVAC (heating, ventilation, air conditioning) units. Since HVACs filter the air of PM 2.5, but don't check if its necessary, the new system can save energy by preventing HVACs from running when unnecessary.

Another source of data is social media data. In particular, geo-referenced picture tags have been successfully used to infer smellscape maps (linked to air quality) and soundscape maps (linked to sound quality) at city level.

== See also ==
- Ubiquitous computing
- Urban informatics
- Smart city
- Bicycle Counters
- Ingress
- Human City Interaction
