= Bicycle counter =

Cycle traffic measuring device

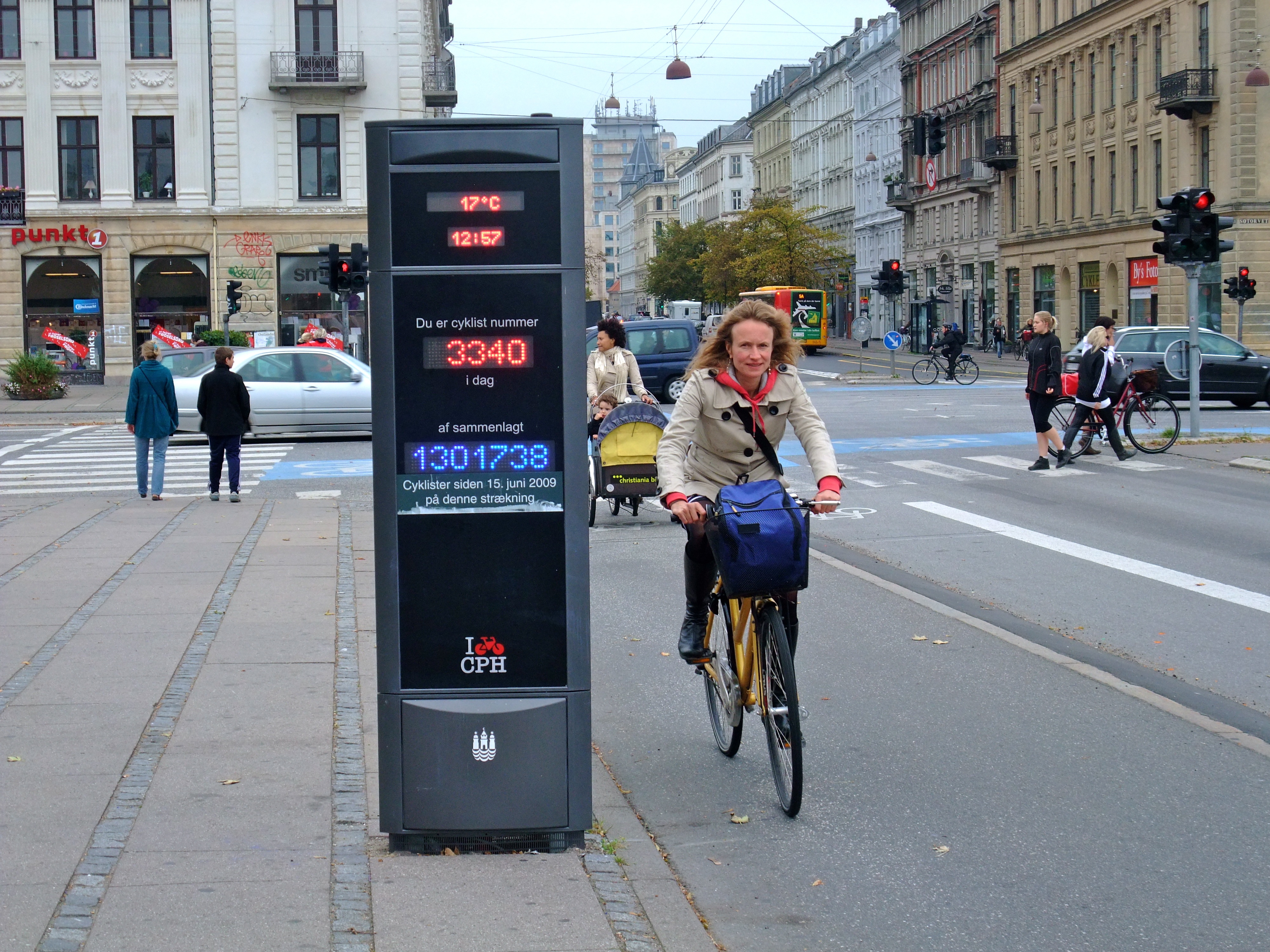
Bicycle counter in Copenhagen, Denmark

Bicycle counters are devices that conduct a traffic count of passing bicycles. Some counters can also detect the speed, direction, and type of bicycles. Most bicycle counters consist of a discrete sensor and a computing device to record and store the data although some also have a public-facing display to show the total number of cyclists of the current day and year. Such systems (with the prominent display) are sometimes referred to as bicycle barometers. There are bicycle counters in hundreds of cities around the world. The first bicycle barometer was installed in Odense, Denmark, in 2002 though cities had been conducting systematic counts of cyclists at least as early as 1994.

== Persuasive aspects ==
Bicycle counters are mainly installed to assist city planning with reliable data on the development of bicycle usage. However the use of bicycle barometers, or prominent displays associated with the count locations, can also serve to normalize cycling as a mode of transportation, encourage more people to use their bicycles and give cyclists acknowledgement. There has been no representative study on the impact of bicycle counters on citizens or by-passers, but some early empirical clues that urban visualizations can "become appropriate communication media for sharing, discussing, and co-producing socially relevant data".

To increase visibility, bicycle counters with displays are mostly installed at positions with high traffic volume and visibility to a range of road users. They have been called urban visualizations and fulfill certain criteria of ambient intelligence, such as being embedded, context-aware and adaptive. Bicycle counting stations can be described as persuasive technology.

"Through sensing technology, a display can act as a tool that increases the capability to capture a behavior (e.g., measuring residential energy consumption, bicycle use, etc.); through its visual imagery, it can function as a medium that provides useful information, such as behavioral statistics or cause-and-effect relationships; and through its networking ability, it can become a social actor, encouraging community-based feedback and social interaction".

== Technical setup ==
Different techniques are used for detection of bicycles, such as built in induction loops, piezoelectric strips, pneumatic hoses, infrared sensing or cameras. Different setups provide different advantages such as more precise counting, battery life, reduced costs or differentiation between different road users such as cyclists, pedestrians or cars. Independent testing has shown that pneumatic tubes can record with over 95% accuracy and piezoelectric sensors reach 99% accuracy. Manufacturers state a 90% precision for induction loops.

== Data ==
Unlike manual counting or other bicycle-related interventions or citizen science, where citizens manually put in data, bicycle counting stations automatically generate citizen-related data. Automatic counting systems are said to be cheaper than manual counting by people. Because of the use of communication technology in the urban context, bicycle counters can be counted as smart city technology, urban informatics or urban computing.

== Criticism ==
There has been criticism on the precision of the counting and on the cost of bicycle counters as a waste of tax money.

== See also ==
Cycling Barometer is also the name of a ranking by the European Cyclists' Federation for the most bicycle-friendly nations in the EU.

There has been creative use of the data generated by counting stations, such as an information design poster which includes the number of daily cyclists, precipitation and temperature.

== Gallery ==
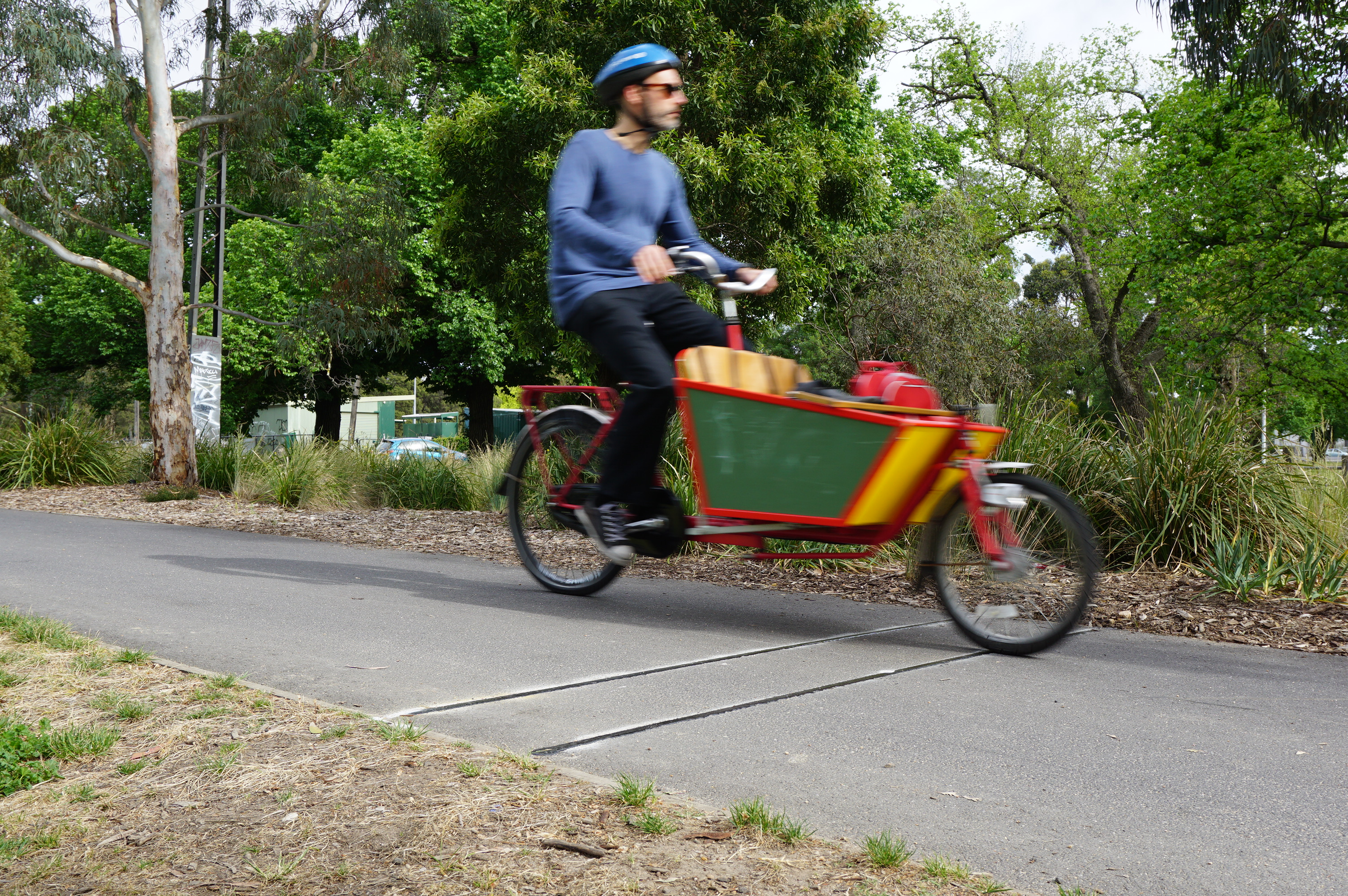
Piezoelectric bike counter in Haarlem, the Netherlands

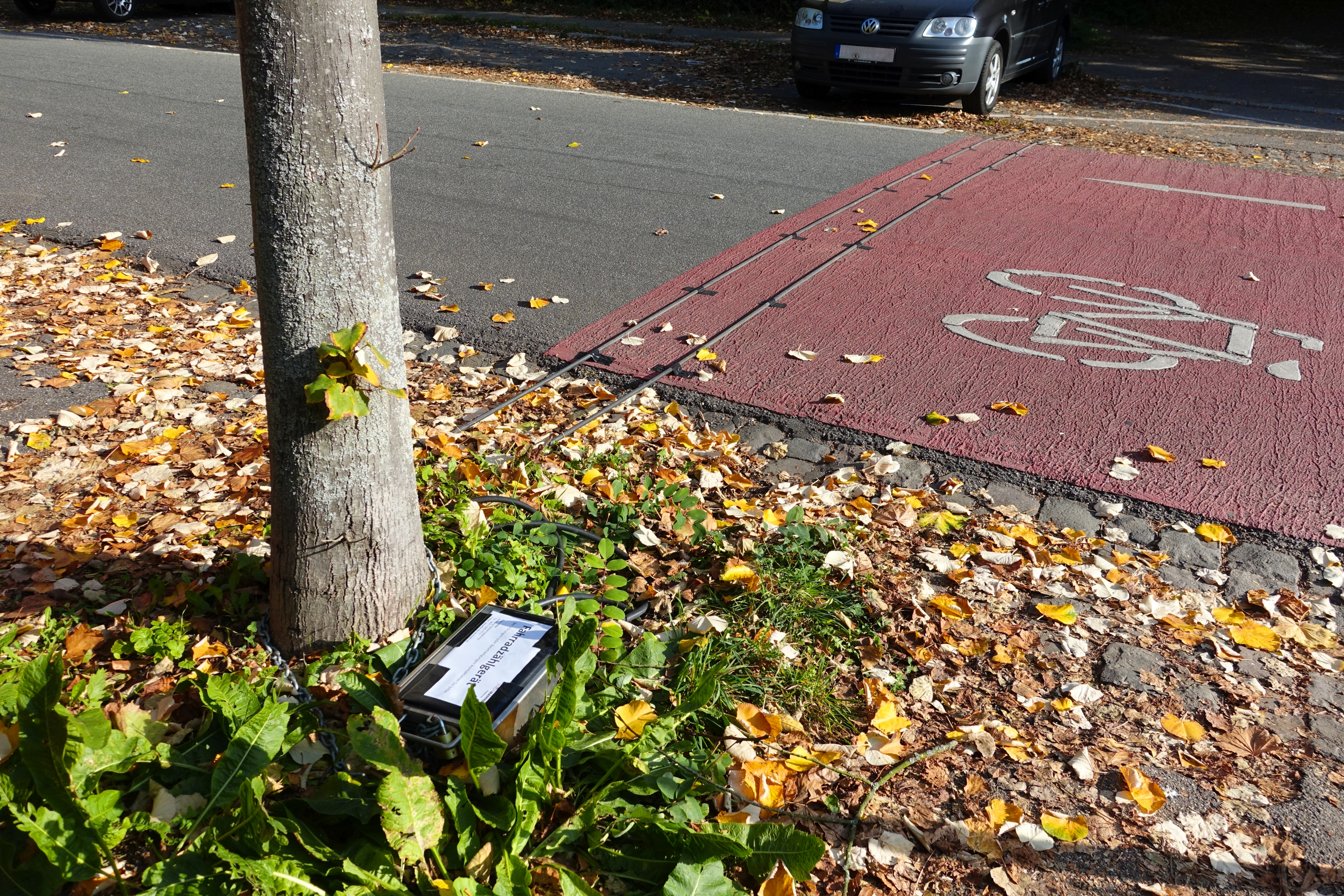
A bicycle counter in Mannheim with pneumatic hoses to detect the number of cyclists

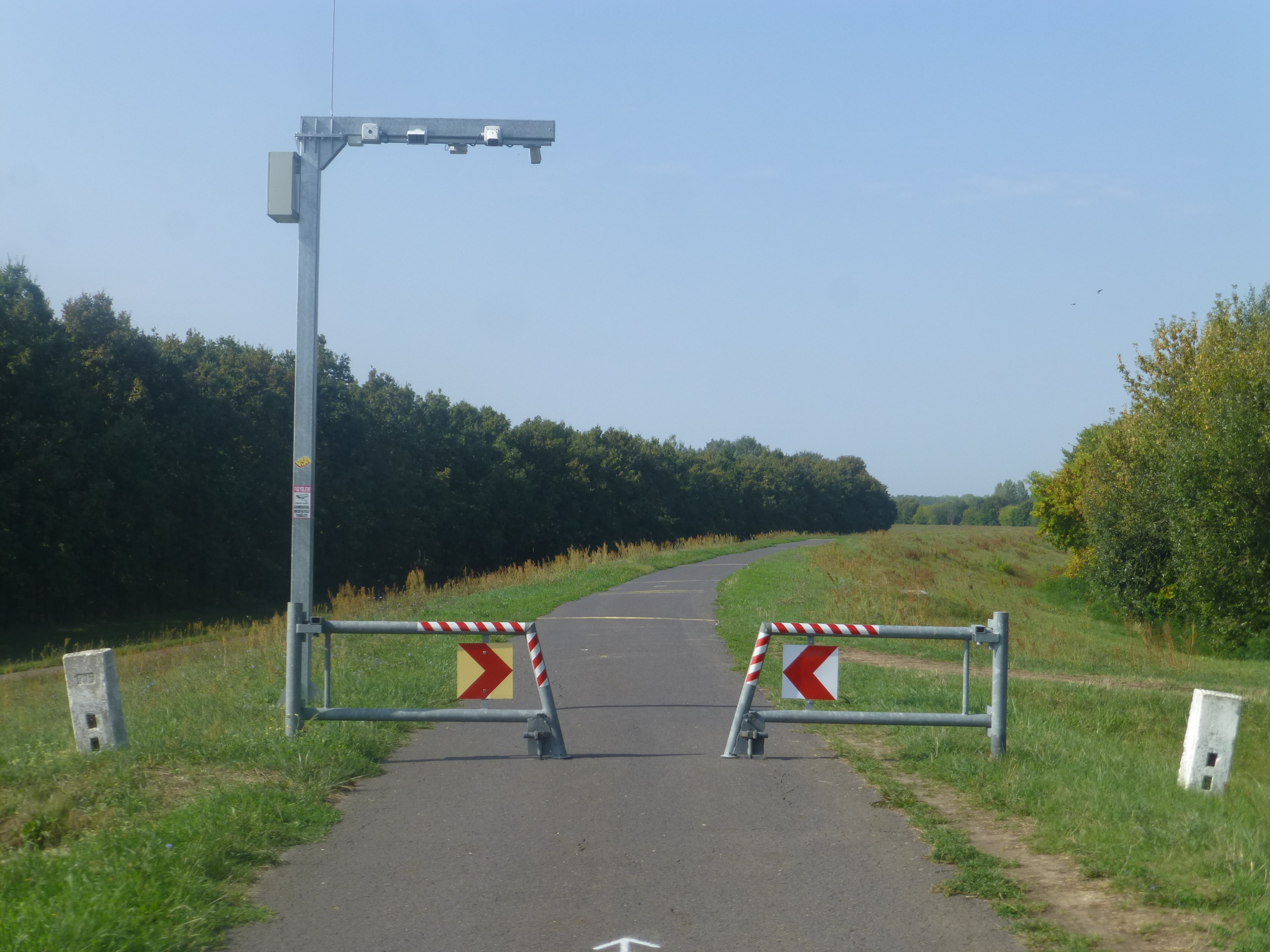
Narrowed passage at the Tisza Cycleway in Hungary with cameras to count cyclists

The technical equipment of a bicycle and pedestrian counter next to a cycle path, using an infrared sensor in Burlington

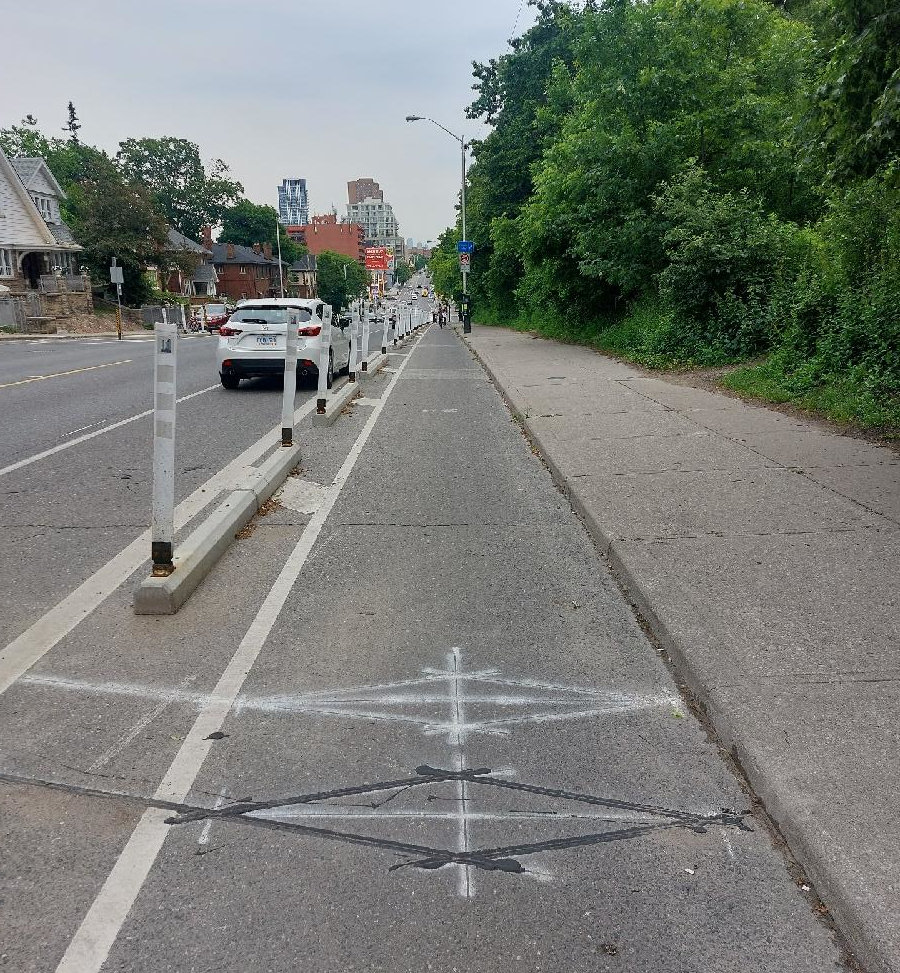
Ecocounter bike sensor installed in a cycle lane on Bloor Street West in Toronto
