= Urban informatics =

Urban informatics refers to the study of people creating, applying and using information and communication technology and data in the context of cities and urban environments. It sits at the conjunction of urban science, geomatics, and informatics, with an ultimate goal of creating more smart and sustainable cities. Various definitions are available, some provided in the Definitions section.

Although first mentions of the term date back as early as 1987, urban informatics did not emerge as a notable field of research and practice until 2006 (see History section). Since then, the emergence and growing popularity of ubiquitous computing, open data and big data analytics, as well as smart cities, contributed to a surge in interest in urban informatics, not just from academics but also from industry and city governments seeking to explore and apply the possibilities and opportunities of urban informatics.

== Definitions ==
Many definitions of urban informatics have been published and can be found online. The descriptions provided by Townsend in his foreword and by Foth in his preface to the Handbook of Research on Urban Informatics emphasises two key aspects: (1) the new possibilities (including real-time data) for both citizens and city administrations afforded by ubiquitous computing, and (2) the convergence of physical and digital aspects of the city.

"Urban informatics is the study, design, and practice of urban experiences across different urban contexts that are created by new opportunities of real-time, ubiquitous technology and the augmentation that mediates the physical and digital layers of people networks and urban infrastructures."

— Foth, Choi, Satchell, 2011, Urban Informatics

In this definition, urban informatics is a trans-disciplinary field of research and practice that draws on three broad domains: people, place and technology.

- "People" can refer to city residents, citizens, and community groups, from various socio-cultural backgrounds, as well as the social dimensions of non-profit organisations and businesses. The social research domains that urban informatics draws from include urban sociology, media studies, communication studies, cultural studies, city planning and others.
- "Place" can refer to distinct urban sites, locales and habitats, as well as to larger-scale geographic entities such as neighbourhoods, public space, suburbs, regions, or peri-urban areas. The place or spatial research domains entail urban studies, architecture, urban design, urban planning, geography, and others.
- "Technology" can refer to various types of information and communication technology and ubiquitous computing / urban computing technology such as mobile phones, wearable devices, urban screens, media façades, sensors, and other Internet of Things devices. The technology research domains span informatics, computer science, software engineering, human–computer interaction, and others.

In addition to geographic data/spatial data, most common sources of data relevant to urban informatics can be divided into three broad categories: government data (census data, open data, etc.); personal data (social media, quantified self data, etc.); and sensor data (transport, surveillance, CCTV, Internet of Things devices, etc.).

Although closely related, Foth differentiates urban informatics from the field of urban computing by suggesting that the former focuses more on the social and human implications of technology in cities (similar to the community and social emphases of how community informatics and social informatics are defined), and the latter focuses more on technology and computing. Urban informatics emphasises the relationship between urbanity, as expressed through the many dimensions of urban life, and technology.

Later, with the increasing popularity of commercial opportunities under the label of smart city and big data, subsequent definitions became narrow and limited in defining urban informatics mainly as big data analytics for efficiency and productivity gains in city contexts – unless the arts and social sciences are added to the interdisciplinary mix. This specialisation within urban informatics is sometimes referred to as 'data-driven, networked urbanism' or urban science.

In the book Urban Informatics published in 2021, the term Urban Informatics has been defined in a systematic and principled way.

"Urban informatics is an interdisciplinary approach to understanding, managing, and designing the city using systematic theories and methods based on new information technologies, and grounded in contemporary developments of computers and communications. It integrates urban science, geomatics, and informatics: urban science provides studies of activities, places, and flows in the urban area; geomatics provides the science and technologies for measuring spatiotemporal and dynamic urban objects in the real world and managing the data obtained from the measurements; informatics provides the science and technologies of information processing, information systems, computer science, and statistics which support the quest to develop applications to cities."

— Shi, Goodchild, Batty, Kwan, Zhang (Eds), 2021, Urban Informatics

== History ==
One of the first occurrences of the term can be found in Mark E. Hepworth's 1987 article "The Information City", which mentions the term "urban informatics" on page 261. However, Hepworth's overall discussion is more concerned with the broader notion of "informatics planning". Considering the article pre-dates the advent of ubiquitous computing and urban computing, it does contain some visionary thoughts about major changes on the horizon brought about by information and communications technology and the impact on cities.

The Urban Informatics Research Lab was founded at Queensland University of Technology in 2006, the first research group explicitly named to reflect its dedication to the study of urban informatics. The first edited book on the topic, the Handbook of Research on Urban Informatics, published in 2009, brought together researchers and scholars from three broad domains: people, place, and technology; or, the social, the spatial, and the technical.

There were many precursors to this transdisciplinarity of "people, place, and technology." From an architecture, planning and design background, there is the work of the late William J. Mitchell, Dean of the MIT School of Architecture and Planning, and author of the 1995 book City of Bits: Space, Place, and the Infobahn. Mitchell was influential in suggesting a profound relationship between place and technology at a time when mainstream interest was focused on the promise of the Information Superhighway and what Frances Cairncross called the "Death of Distance". Rather than a decline in the significance of place through remote work, distance education, and e-commerce, the physical / tangible layers of the city started to mix with the digital layers of the internet and online communications. Aspects of this trend have been studied under the terms community informatics and community networks.

One of the first texts that systematically examined the impact of information technologies on the spatial and social evolution of cities is Telecommunications and the City: Electronic Spaces, Urban Places, by Stephen Graham and Simon Marvin. The relationship between cities and the internet was further expanded upon in a volume edited by Stephen Graham entitled Cybercities Reader and by various authors in the 2006 book Networked Neighbourhoods: The Connected Community in Context edited by Patrick Purcell. Additionally, contributions from architecture, design and planning scholars are contained in the 2007 journal special issue on "Space, Sociality, and Pervasive Computing" published in the journal Environment and Planning B: Planning and Design, 34(3), guest edited by the late Bharat Dave, as well as in the 2008 book Augmented Urban Spaces: Articulating the Physical and Electronic City, edited by Alessandro Aurigi and Fiorella De Cindio, based on contributions to the Digital Cities 4 workshop held in conjunction with the Communities and Technologies (C&T) conference 2005 in Milan, Italy.

The first prominent and explicit use of the term "urban informatics" in the sociology and media studies literature appears in the 2007 special issue "Urban Informatics: Software, Cities and the New Cartographies of Knowing Capitalism" published in the journal Information, Communication & Society, 10(6), guest edited by Ellison, Burrows, & Parker. Later on, in 2013, Burrows and Beer argued that the socio-technical transformations described by research studies conducted in the field of urban informatics give reason for sociologists more broadly to not only question epistemological and methodological norms and practices but also to rethink spatial assumptions.

In computer science, the sub-domains of human–computer interaction, ubiquitous computing, and urban computing provided early contributions that influenced the emerging field of urban informatics. Examples include the Digital Cities workshop series (see below), Greenfield's 2006 book Everyware: The Dawning Age of Ubiquitous Computing, and the 2006 special issue "Urban Computing: Navigating Space and Context" published in the IEEE journal Computer, 39(9), guest edited by Shklovski & Chang, and the 2007 special issue "Urban Computing" published in the IEEE journal Pervasive Computing, 6(3), guest edited by Kindberg, Chalmers, & Paulos.

== Digital Cities Workshop Series ==
The Digital Cities Workshop Series started in 1999 and is the longest running academic workshop series that has focused on, and profoundly influenced, the field of urban informatics. The first two workshops in 1999 and 2001 were both held in Kyoto, Japan, with subsequent workshops since 2003 held in conjunction with the biennial International Conference on Communities and Technologies (C&T).

Each Digital Cities workshop proceedings have become the basis for key anthologies listed below, which in turn have also been formative to a diverse set of emerging fields, including urban informatics, urban computing, smart cities, pervasive computing, internet of things, media architecture, urban interaction design, and urban science.

Workshop	Location	Resulting anthology
Digital Cities 1	Kyoto, Japan, 1999	Ishida, T., & Isbister, K. (Eds.). (2000). Digital Cities: Technologies, Experiences, and Future Perspectives (Lecture Notes in Computer Science No. 1765). Heidelberg, Germany: Springer.
Digital Cities 2	Kyoto, Japan, 2001	Tanabe, M., van den Besselaar, P., & Ishida, T. (Eds.) (2002). Digital Cities 2: Computational and Sociological Approaches (Lecture Notes in Computer Science No. 2362). Heidelberg, Germany: Springer.
Digital Cities 3	C&T 2003, Amsterdam, NL	Van den Besselaar, P., & Koizumi, S. (Eds.) (2005). Digital Cities 3: Information Technologies for Social Capital (Lecture Notes in Computer Science No. 3081). Heidelberg, Germany: Springer.
Digital Cities 4	C&T 2005, Milan, Italy	Aurigi, A., & De Cindio, F. (Eds.) (2008). Augmented Urban Spaces: Articulating the Physical and Electronic City. Aldershot, UK: Ashgate.
Digital Cities 5	C&T 2007, Michigan, U.S.	Foth, M. (Ed.) (2009). Handbook of Research on Urban Informatics: The Practice and Promise of the Real-Time City. Hershey, PA: Information Science Reference, IGI Global.
Digital Cities 6	C&T 2009, Penn State, U.S.	Foth, M., Forlano, L., Satchell, C., & Gibbs, M. (Eds.) (2011). From Social Butterfly to Engaged Citizen: Urban Informatics, Social Media, Ubiquitous Computing, and Mobile Technology to Support Citizen Engagement. Cambridge, Massachusetts: MIT Press.
Digital Cities 7	C&T 2011, Brisbane, Australia	Foth, M., Brynskov, M., & Ojala, T. (Eds.) (2015). Citizen's Right to the Digital City: Urban Interfaces, Activism, and Placemaking. Singapore: Springer.
Digital Cities 8	C&T 2013, Munich, Germany	Foth, M., Brynskov, M., & Ojala, T. (Eds.) (2015). Citizen's Right to the Digital City: Urban Interfaces, Activism, and Placemaking. Singapore: Springer.
Digital Cities 9	C&T 2015, Limerick, Ireland	de Lange, M., & de Waal, M. (Eds.) (2019). The Hackable City: Digital Media & Collaborative City-making in the Network Society. London: Springer.
Digital Cities 10	C&T 2017, Troyes, France	Odendaal, N. & Aurigi, A. (Eds.) (2017). Proceedings of Digital Cities 10: Towards a localised socio-technical understanding of the 'real' smart city. In conjunction with the 8th International Conference on Communities and Technologies (C&T) 2017, Troyes, France.
Digital Cities 11	C&T 2019, Vienna, Austria	Foth, M., Heitlinger, S., Tomitsch, M., & Clarke, R. (Eds.) (2019). Proceedings of Digital Cities 11: Communities and Technologies for More-than-Human Futures. In conjunction with the 9th International Conference on Communities and Technologies (C&T) 2019, Vienna, Austria.

== Research centres ==
Year	Research centres
1995	UCL Centre for Advanced Spatial Analysis, University College London
1995	MIT Urban Information Systems Group, MIT School of Architecture and Planning, Massachusetts Institute of Technology
2003	Smart Cities Program, MIT Media Lab, Massachusetts Institute of Technology
2004	MIT Senseable City Lab, Massachusetts Institute of Technology
2005	Urban Scaling Working Group, Santa Fe Institute
2006	Urban Informatics Research Lab, Queensland University of Technology
2007	The Mobile City, The Netherlands
2009	Media Architecture Institute, Vienna. From 2011 also in Sydney, for 2015 in Beijing, and 2016 in Toronto.
2009	Urban Analytics Lab, University of California, Berkeley
2010	Future Cities Laboratory, ETH Zürich
2011	Boston Area Research Initiative, Radcliffe Institute for Advanced Study, Harvard University
2012	Center for Urban Science and Progress, New York University
2012	Intel Collaborative Research Institute for Sustainable and Connected Cities (ICRI Cities), Imperial College and University College London
2012	Urban Center for Computation and Data, University of Chicago and Argonne National Laboratory
2012	IMM Design Lab, Politecnico di Milano, Italy
2013	Urban Information Lab, University of Texas at Austin
2013	MediaLab-Prado, Madrid
2013	Programmable City Project, Maynooth University
2013	Amsterdam Institute for Advanced Metropolitan Solutions, TU Delft
2014	Warwick Institute for the Science of Cities, University of Warwick
2014	Urban Big Data Centre, University of Glasgow
2014	City Sciences, Universidad Politécnica de Madrid
2014	Metro21, Carnegie Mellon University
2015	Center for Spatial Research, Columbia University
2015	Urban Informatics Program, Northeastern University
2017	Urban Informatics Major, Shenzhen University
2017	City Analytics, University of New South Wales
	City Future Lab, Indian Institute of Technology, Kharagpur
2017	Centre of Urban Science and Progress London, King's College London
2018	Laboratory for Smart City and Spatial Big Data Analytics, Hong Kong Polytechnic University
2019	Urban Analytics Lab, National University of Singapore
2020	Smart Cities Research Institute, Hong Kong Polytechnic University

== Methods ==
The diverse range of people, groups and organisations involved in urban informatics is reflective of the diversity of methods being used in its pursuit and practice. As a result, urban informatics borrows from a wide range of methodologies across the social sciences, humanities, arts, design, architecture, planning (including geographic information systems), and technology (in particular computer science, pervasive computing, and ubiquitous computing), and applies those to the urban domain. Examples include:

- Action research and participatory action research
- Big data analytics and urban science
- Critical theory
- Cultural mapping
- Grounded theory
- Interaction design
- Participatory design
- Spatial analysis, including urban modelling, complex urban systems analysis, geographic information systems, and space syntax analysis
- User-centred design

== See also ==
- Communicative ecology
- Community informatics
- E-government
- Geoinformatics
- Human–computer interaction
- Interaction design
- Location-based service
- Locative media
- Placemaking
- Ubiquitous computing
- Urban computing

Year	Publication
2011	Shepard, M. (Ed.) (2011). Sentient City: Ubiquitous Computing, Architecture, and the Future of Urban Space. Cambridge, Massachusetts: MIT Press.
2011	Foth, M., Forlano, L., Satchell, C., & Gibbs, M. (Eds.) (2011). From Social Butterfly to Engaged Citizen: Urban Informatics, Social Media, Ubiquitous Computing, and Mobile Technology to Support Citizen Engagement. Cambridge, Massachusetts: MIT Press.
2011	Kitchin, R., & Dodge, M. (2011). Code/Space: Software and Everyday Life. Cambridge, Massachusetts: MIT Press.
2011	Gordon, E., & de Souza e Silva, A. (2011). Net Locality: Why Location Matters in a Networked World. Chichester, UK: Wiley-Blackwell.
2011	Hearn, G., Foth, M., & Stevenson, T. (Eds.). (2011). Community Engagement for Sustainable Urban Futures. Special issue of Futures, 43(4).
2012	Foth, M., Rittenbruch, M., Robinson, R., & Viller, S. (Eds.) (2012). Street Computing. Special issue of the Journal of Urban Technology, 19(2).
2013	Townsend, A. (2013). Smart Cities: Big Data, Civic Hackers, and the Quest for a New Utopia. New York, NY: W. W. Norton.
2013	McCullough, M. (2013). Ambient Commons: Attention in the Age of Embodied Information. Cambridge, Massachusetts: MIT Press.
2013	Greenfield, A. (2013). Against the Smart City. New York, NY: Do Projects.
2014	Foth, M., Rittenbruch, M., Robinson, R., & Viller, S. (Eds.) (2014). Street Computing: Urban Informatics and City Interfaces. Abingdon, UK: Routledge.
2014	de Waal, M. (2014). The City as Interface: How New Media are Changing the City. Rotterdam, NL: NAi010 Publisher.
2014	Unsworth, K., Forte, A., & Dilworth, R. (Eds.) (2014). Urban Informatics: The Role of Citizen Participation in Policy Making. Special issue of the Journal of Urban Technology, 21(4).
2015	Houghton, K., & Choi, J. H.-j. (Eds.) (2015). Urban Acupuncture. Special issue of the Journal of Urban Technology, 22(3).
2015	Kukka, H., Foth, M., & Dey, A. K. (Eds.) (2015). Transdisciplinary Approaches to Urban Computing. Special issue of the International Journal of Human-Computer Studies, 81.
2015	Foth, M., Brynskov, M., & Ojala, T. (Eds.) (2015). Citizen's Right to the Digital City: Urban Interfaces, Activism, and Placemaking. Singapore: Springer.
2015	Willis, K. S. (2015). Netspaces: Space and Place in a Networked World. London, UK: Routledge.
2015	Salim, F., & Haque, U. (2015). "Urban computing in the wild: A survey on large scale participation and citizen engagement with ubiquitous computing, cyber physical Systems, and internet of Things". International Journal of Human-Computer Studies, 81(Transdisciplinary Approaches to Urban Computing), 31–48.
2016	Katz, V. S., & Hampton, K. N. (Eds.) (2016). Communication in City and Community: From the Chicago School to Digital Technology. Special issue of the American Behavioral Scientist, 60(1).
2016	Ratti, C., & Claudel, M. (2016). The City of Tomorrow: Sensors, Networks, Hackers, and the Future of Urban Life. New Haven, CT: Yale University Press.
2017	Thakuriah, P., Tilahun, N., & Zellner, M. (Eds.) (2017, in press). Seeing Cities Through Big Data: Research, Methods and Applications in Urban Informatics. London, UK: Springer.
2021	Shi, W., Goodchild, M. F., Batty, M., Kwan, M. P., & Zhang, A. (Eds.). (2021). Urban informatics. Singapore: Springer.
