= Eric Paulos =

American computer scientist

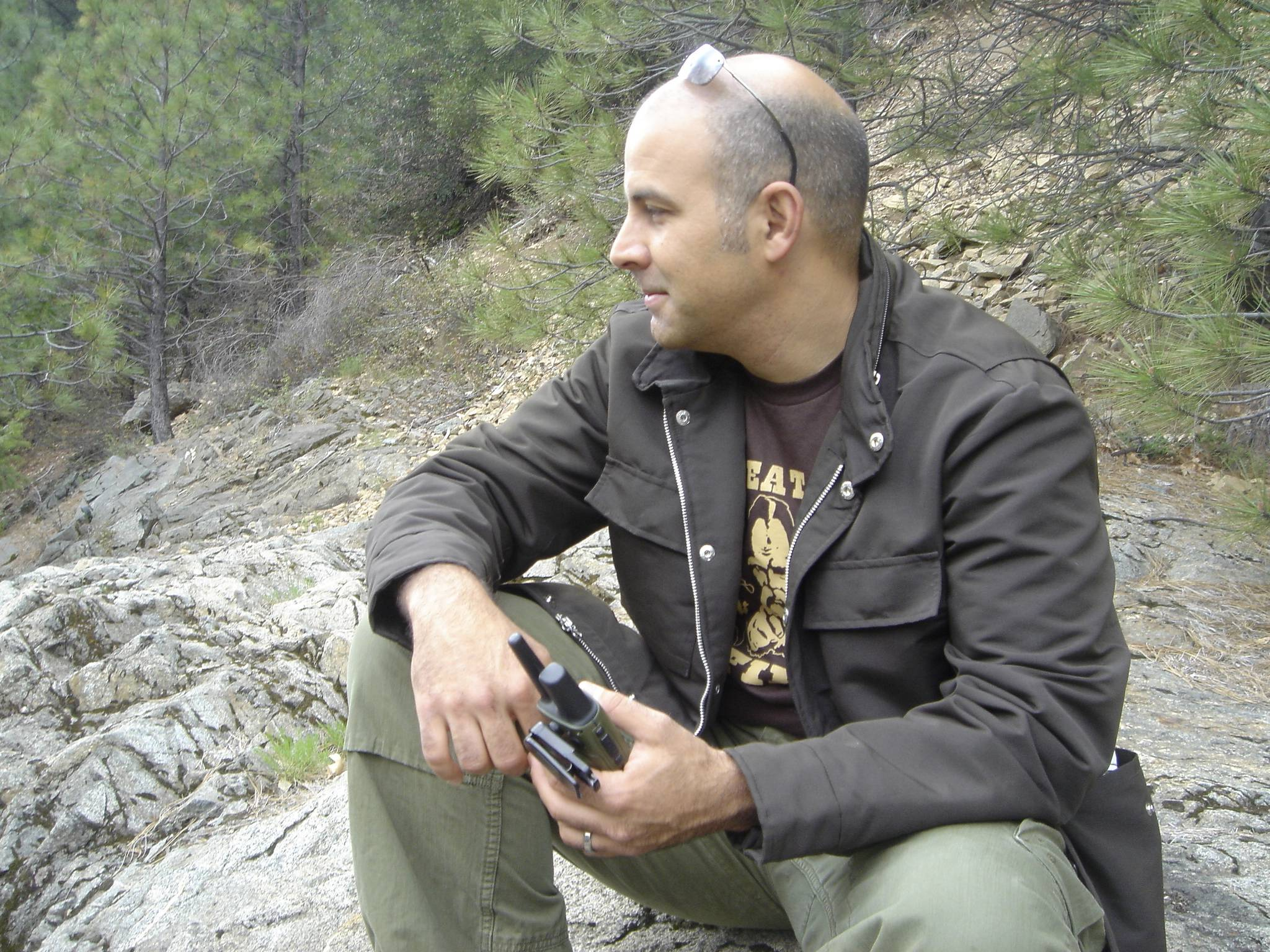
- Education: UC Berkeley
- Occupation: Professor
- Known for: computer science research, art, robotics research
- Website: www.paulos.net

Eric Paulos is an American computer scientist, artist (working in new media art), and inventor, best known for his early work on internet robotic teleoperation and is considered a founder of the field of Urban Computing, coining the term "urban computing" in 2004. His current work is in the areas of emancipation fabrication, cosmetic computing, citizen science, New Making Renaissance, Critical Making, Robotics, DIY Biology, DIY culture, Micro-volunteering, and the cultural critique of such technologies through New Media strategies.

Paulos is the founder and director of the Hybrid Ecologies Lab, an associate professor in Electrical Engineering Computer Science Department at UC Berkeley, Director of the Jacobs Institute for Design Innovation, director of the CITRIS Invention Lab, and faculty within the Berkeley Center for New Media (BCNM). Eric was also the founding Director of the Master of Design (MDes) program at UC Berkeley. Eric is also a member of the ACM CHI Academy.

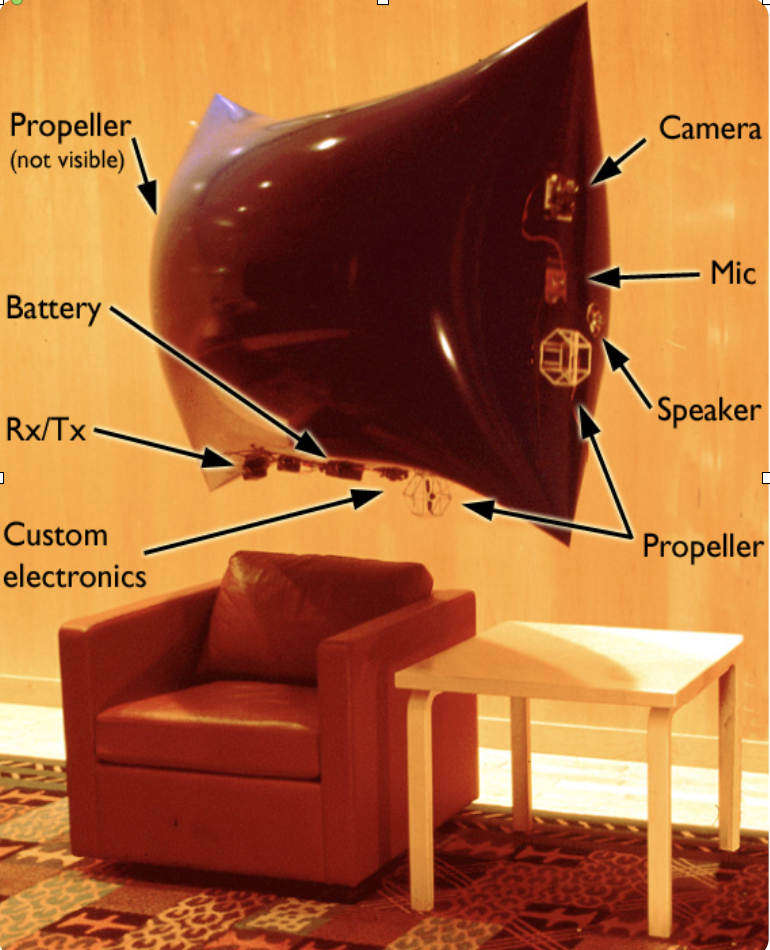
PRoP: Personal roving Presence early telepresence system developed by Eric Paulos. Blimp version from 1994.

Previously, Paulos held the Cooper-Siegel Associate Professor Chair in the School of Computer Science at Carnegie Mellon University where he was faculty within the Human-Computer Interaction Institute with courtesy faculty appointments in the Robotics Institute and in the Entertainment Technology Center. At CMU he was also director of the Living Environments Lab. Prior to CMU, Paulos was senior research scientist at Intel Research at one of the Intel Research Lablets in Berkeley, California where he founded the Urban Atmospheres research group – challenged to employ innovative methods to explore urban life and the future fabric of emerging technologies across public urban landscapes. His areas of expertise span a deep body of research territory in urban computing, sustainability, green design, environmental awareness, social telepresence, robotics, physical computing, interaction design, persuasive technologies, and intimate media. Paulos is a regular contributor, editorial board member, and reviewer for numerous professional journals and conferences. His published work is primarily in the areas of Robotics, Urban Computing, Human-Computer Interaction, Computer supported cooperative work, and Ubicomp. He received his PhD in Electrical Engineering and Computer Science from UC Berkeley where he helped launch a new robotic industry by developing some of the first internet tele-operated robots including Space Browsing helium filled blimps and Personal Roving Presence devices (PRoPs).

Paulos is also the founder and director of the Experimental Interaction Unit and a frequent collaborator with Mark Pauline of Survival Research Laboratories. His work has been exhibited at the InterCommunication Center (ICC) in Japan, Ars Electronica, ISEA, SIGGRAPH, the Dutch Electronic Art Festival (DEAF), SFMOMA, the Chelsea Art Museum, Art Interactive, LA MOCA, Yerba Buena Center for the Arts, the ZKM, Southern Exposure, and a performance for the opening of the Whitney Museum's 1997 Biennial Exhibition.

Born and raised in California, Paulos received a B.S., M.S., and Ph.D. in Electrical Engineering and Computer Science from the University of California, Berkeley, completing his Ph.D. in 2001. Paulos has also collaborated with Mark Pauline of Survival Research Laboratories since 1994.

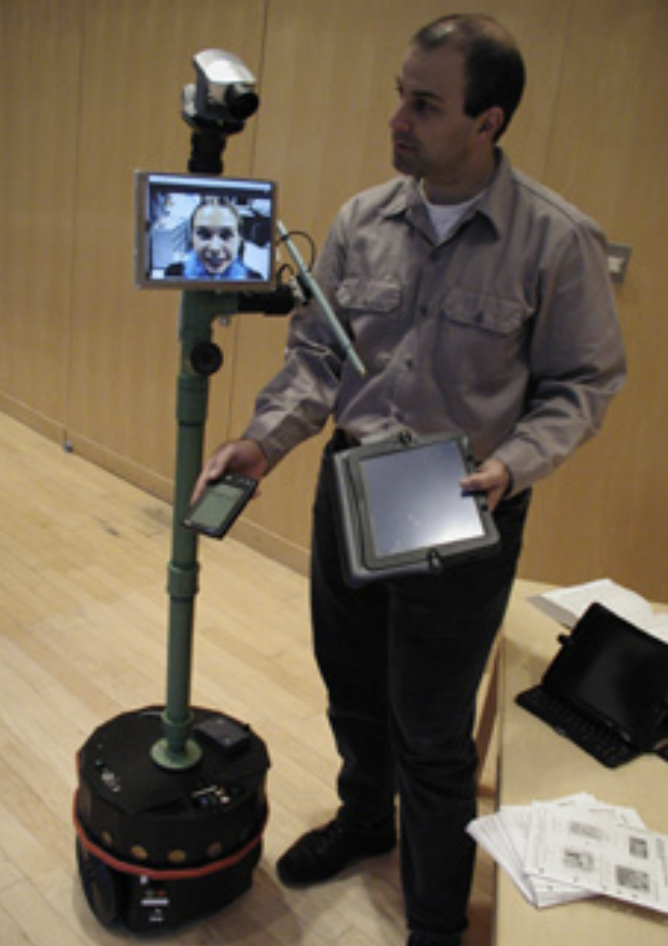
PRoP: Personal roving Presence early telepresence system developed by Eric Paulos (1993-2000).

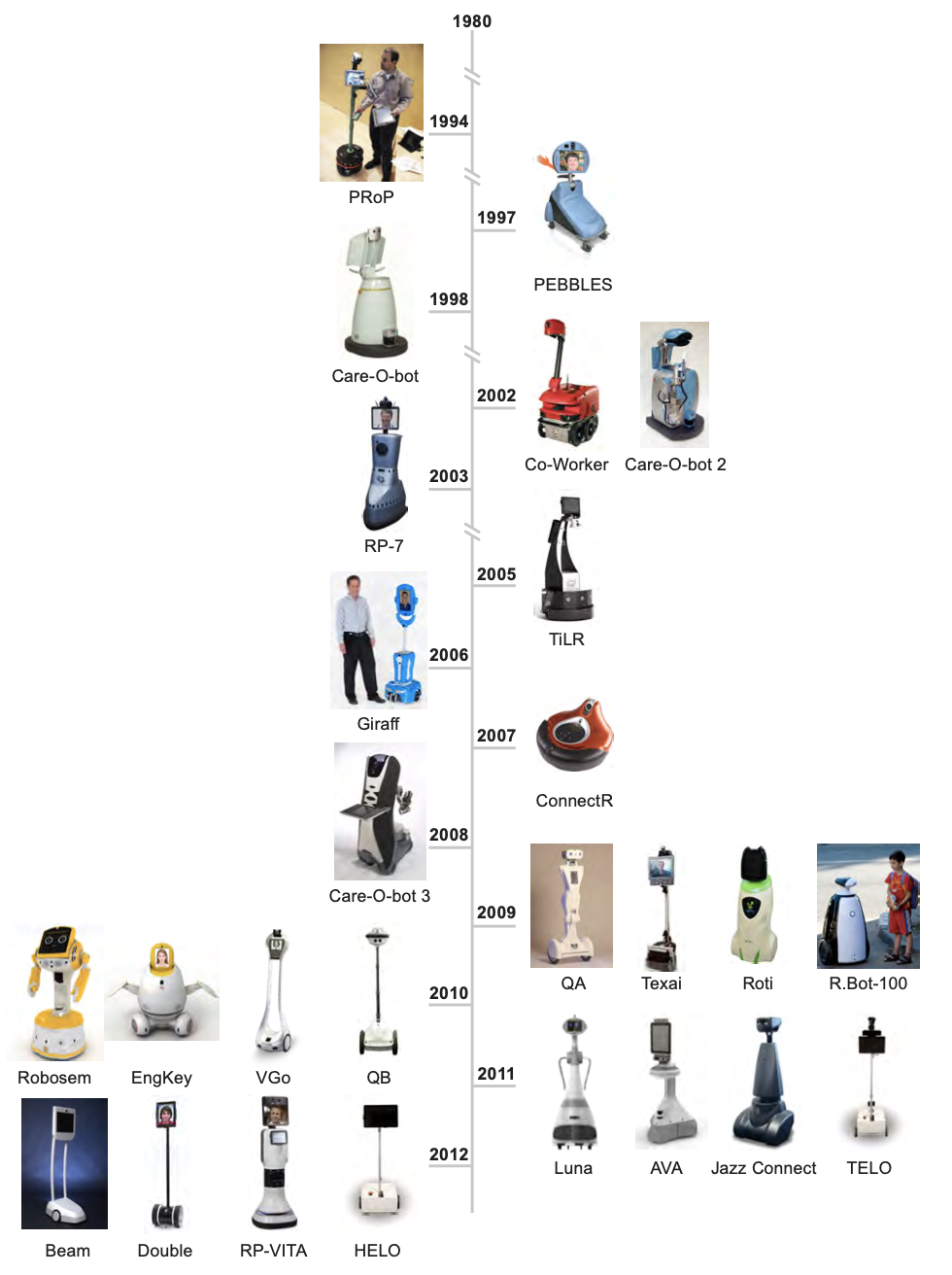
Visual history of Internet Telepresence showing origins with Paulos' PRoPs in 1994

== Notable innovative projects ==
- 1994 Mechanical Gaze – third robot on the web and first remote robot using color image as well as for museum artifact exploration
- 1993–2000 PRoPs – first online mobile telepresence robot using blimps and ground based robotic platforms
- 2000 TeleActor – First remote control of skilled human equipped with a wireless camera who moves through and interacts based on remote commands delivered in real time one the internet. (with Ken Goldberg, David Pescovitz, and Judith Donath)
- 2002 Connexus – First smartwatch with haptic messaging using touch, stroke, and heartbeat as inout and light, heat, and vibration as output to paired device. Technology later released in 2015 as Real Touch in Apple Watch.
- 2007 Citizen Science on Mobile Smartphones – First use of smartphones with air quality sensors attached to collect and crowdsource location based air quality data.

== Selected bibliography ==
- Paulos, E. and Canny J. 1998. PRoP: Personal Roving Presence. ACM SIGCHI, 296 - 303.
- Paulos, E. and Canny J. 2000. Personal Tele-embodiment: Reconstructing the Body for Online Interaction in The Robot in the Garden: Telerobotics and Telepistemonogy on the Internet, Cambridge: MIT Press.
- Paulos, E. and Canny J. 2001. Social Tele-embodiment: Understanding Presence. Autonomous Robots, 11(1), 87-95.
- Paulos, E. and Goodman, E. 2004. The Familiar Stranger: Anxiety, Comfort, and Play in Public Places. ACM SIGCHI, 223-230.
