= HCI Bibliography =

The HCI Bibliography is a web-based project to provide a bibliography of Human Computer Interaction (HCI) literature. The goal of the Project is to put an electronic bibliography for most of HCI on the screens of all researchers, developers, educators and students in the field through the World-Wide Web and anonymous ftp access.

== Introduction ==
The HCI Bibliography Project is an effort aiming at giving free of charge access to all information seekers searching for bibliographic information in the field of HCI. This is a database, accessible from anywhere in the world. The HCI bibliographic project was inspired by Gary Perlman (director of the HCI Bibliography project) in 1998. Initially, the project was struggling to find funding and sponsors, but fortunately study-work students at Ohio State University were available to perform the task of entering the bibliographic data into the database. Some people from the internet were willing to help with the task of verifying the data. Donation from publishers also played a role in the building of the database. While there were less funding and sponsors at the beginning of the project, publishers gave the HCI Bibliography team permission to put their materials online for free of charge.

As of September 2024, the site is no longer accepting updates, and this policy probably was established in 2016.

== Donor Publishers ==
In 2007, the HCI Bibliography group acknowledges several publishers for their support of the project. Project support included publishers giving copyright permission and donation of publications to be entered into the HCI Bibliography database.

- Ablex Publishing
- Academic Press (AP)
- Association for Computing Machinery (ACM)
- Butterworth-Heinemann, Ltd.
- Cambridge University Press
- Elsevier Science Publishers, (North-Holland)
- Ergonomics Society of Australia
- Human Factors and Ergonomics Society (HFS / HFES)
- International Centre for Scientific and Technical Information
- Institute of Electrical and Electronics Engineers (IEEE)
- Intellect Ltd.
- Kluwer Academic Publishers
- Lawrence Erlbaum Associates (LEA)
- MIT Press
- Morgan Kaufmann Publishers, Inc.
- Springer-Verlag
- Taylor & Francis Ltd.
- Taylor & Graham Publishing
- John Wiley & Sons

As of July 2009, the HCI Bibliography has over 50,000 entries. These entries are made up of Journal volumes, Conference Proceeding, Books and some special files.
