= Digital Live Art =

Digital Live Art is the intersection of Live Art (art form), Computing and Human Computer Interaction (HCI). It is used to describe live performance which is computer mediated - an orchestrated, temporal witnessed event occurring for any length of time and in any place using technological means. Digital Live Art borrows the methods, tools and theories from HCI to help inform and analyze the design and evaluation of Digital Live Art experiences.

== Theory ==
Central to the understanding of Digital Live Art is the concept of performance framing (social sciences). First identified by Gregory Bateson, the performance frame is described as a cognitive context where all the rules of behavior, symbols, and their interpretations are bound within a particular activity within its own structure. The concept has since been used extensively in ethnography by Erving Goffman in his discussions of face to face encounters in the everyday, in discourse structures; in theatrical and ritual events; sporting events and festivals; and trance phenomena (see:).

Goffman's work uses the concept of performance frame to broadly mean a constructed context within the limits of which individual human agency and social interaction takes place. For example, a theatrical frame, pp. 124–155) involves the construction of a higher-level frame on top of a ‘primary framework’, i.e., the reality in which the fantasy takes place. In this example, actors assume a character, audiences suspend disbelief and events have their meaning transformed (e.g., compare the use of a mobile phone in public with its use in a theatre). Additionally, framings are temporal, meaning that they have specific beginning and endings. While many theorists argue that all social interaction may be seen from a dramaturgical perspective, meaning all everyday social interaction becomes performance in some sense, Digital Live Art theorists often deliberately align their work with Richard Schechner, narrowing their analysis to cover more stabilized ‘established’ forms of performance so that performance framing is defined as an activity done within the intended frame ‘by an individual or group’ who have some established knowledge about the frame, and are ‘in the presence of and for another individual or group’. Performance framings then, are intentional, temporal and for an audience.

== Method and Tools ==
The goal of interaction in Digital Live Art goes beyond that of traditional HCI methods and theory which focus on usability, functionality and efficiency. HCI and CSCW models often focus on workplace activities and their tasks, artefacts and goals. This research often leads to a better understanding of how to increase efficiency in the workplace by providing more efficient and usable interfaces. For example, one could conduct usability testing or task analysis of how a DJ uses his DJ decks and one could then use this information to design a more efficient system.

However, traditional HCI models tell us little about how the performer-audience relationship develops as a result of users wittingness to interact with the system. The intention with Digital Live Art is not to make more "usable" systems but rather to allow for "participatory transitions" - transitions between "witting and unwitting", between observation and participation, between participation and performance. Since the goal with Digital Live Art systems is to "mediate wittingness" rather than task-focused interaction, the application of many HCI models, frameworks and methods become insufficient for analyzing and evaluating Digital Live Art.

=== Performance Triad Model ===
Sheridan first introduced the Performance Triad Model for analyzing "tripartite interaction" - interaction between observers, participants and performers. In the Performance Triad Model, tripartite interaction where technology binds tripartite interaction to context and environment. Reeves et al. draws a distinction between a performer and a spectator and how their transitioning relationship as mediated by the interface.

=== Formal Method ===
Dix and Sheridan introduced a formal method for analyzing "performative interaction" in Digital Live Art. This formal method provides a mathematical technique for deconstructing interaction between witting and unwitting bystanders and observers, participants in the performance and the performers themselves. The work attempts to formalise some of the basic attributes of performative interaction against a background of sociological analysis in order to better understand how computer interfaces may support performance. This work shows how this generic formalisation can be used in the deconstruction, analysis and understanding of performative action and more broadly in live performance.

== See also ==
- Fine art
- Visual arts
- Performance art
