= Traffic count =

The number of vehicles passing an area

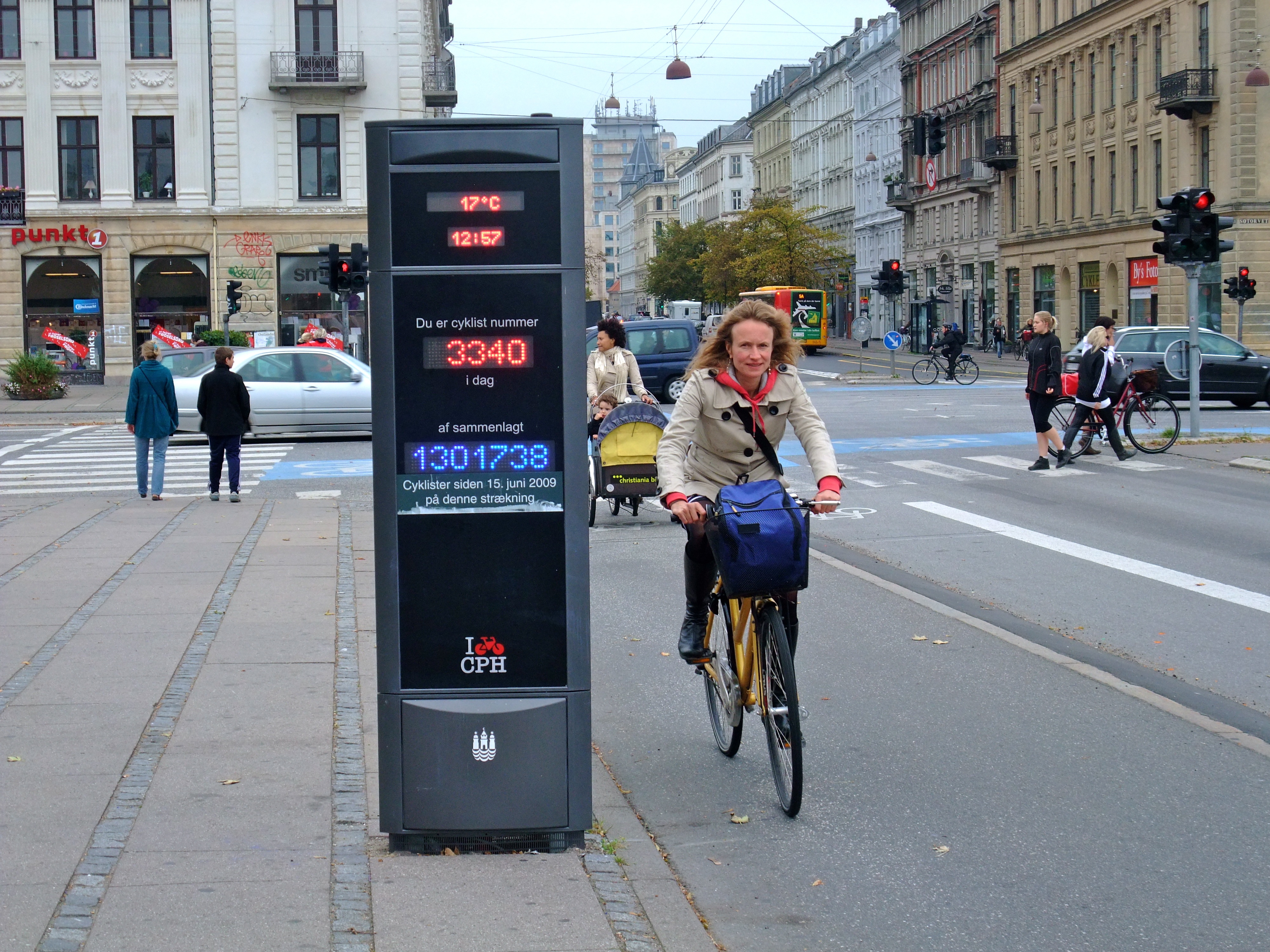
Bike counter with display showing the number of bikes on the particular day and accumulative for the year, for one bike lane in Copenhagen

A traffic count is a count of vehicular or pedestrian traffic, which is conducted along a street or road or at an intersection. A traffic count is commonly undertaken either automatically (with the installation of a temporary or permanent electronic traffic recording device), or manually by observers who visually count and record traffic on a hand-held electronic device or tally sheet. A count conducted at an intersection is called a turning movement count and separately records the different movements of people and vehicles through the intersection. Traffic counts are used by governments for many purposes such as providing warrants for specific infrastructure changes, prioritizing maintenance work, and as inputs to traffic demand models or other planning exercises. Traffic counts provide the source data used to calculate the Annual Average Daily Traffic (AADT), a common indicator used to represent traffic volume. Traffic counts that include speeds are used in speed limit enforcement efforts, highlighting peak speeding periods to optimise speed-camera use and educational efforts.

== Counting methods ==
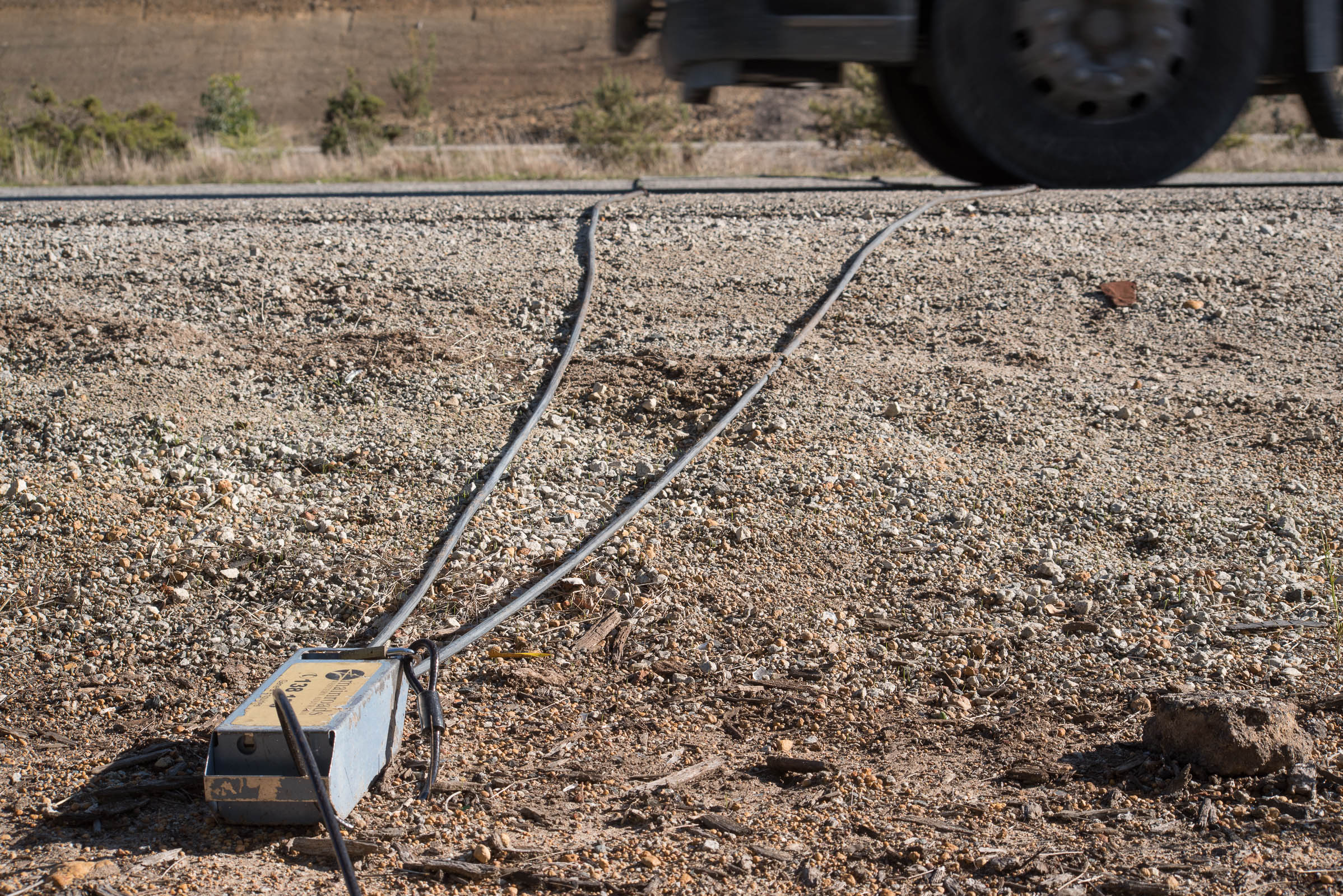
Traffic counter being activated as a truck passes over the pneumatic tube

Traffic counts can be obtained manually or automatically. Manual counts involve stationing a person (or persons) at a specific point by a road with instructions to count passing vehicles over a given period. This may involve differentiating by vehicle type. Automatic traffic counters can provide longer-term data, including more detailed information about vehicle type, but require ongoing maintenance and upkeep.

== Traffic counter devices ==
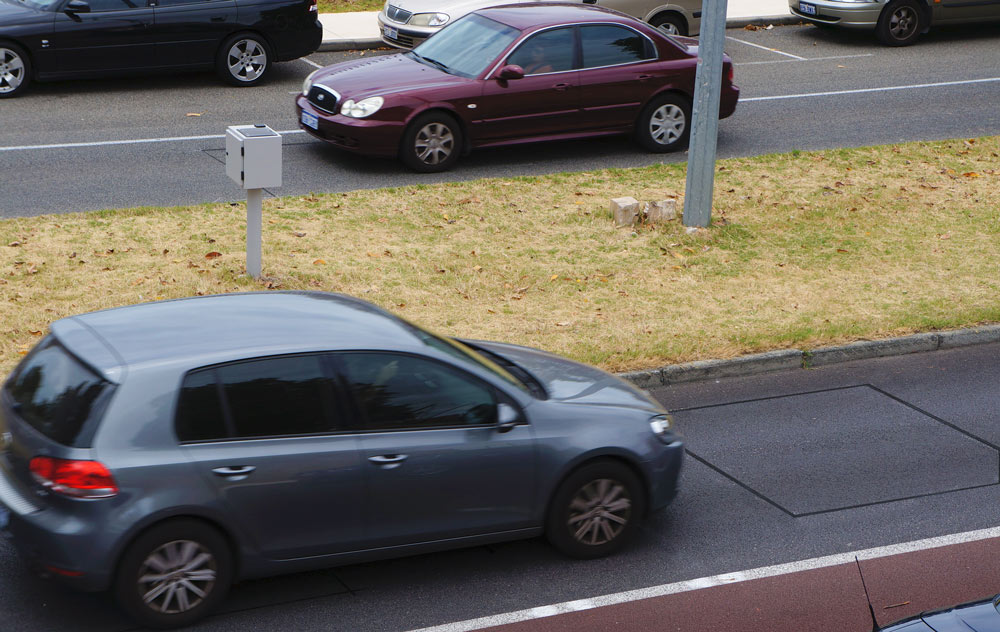
Traffic counter system using inductive loops connected to a cabinet with solar panels and 3G modem to transmit traffic information

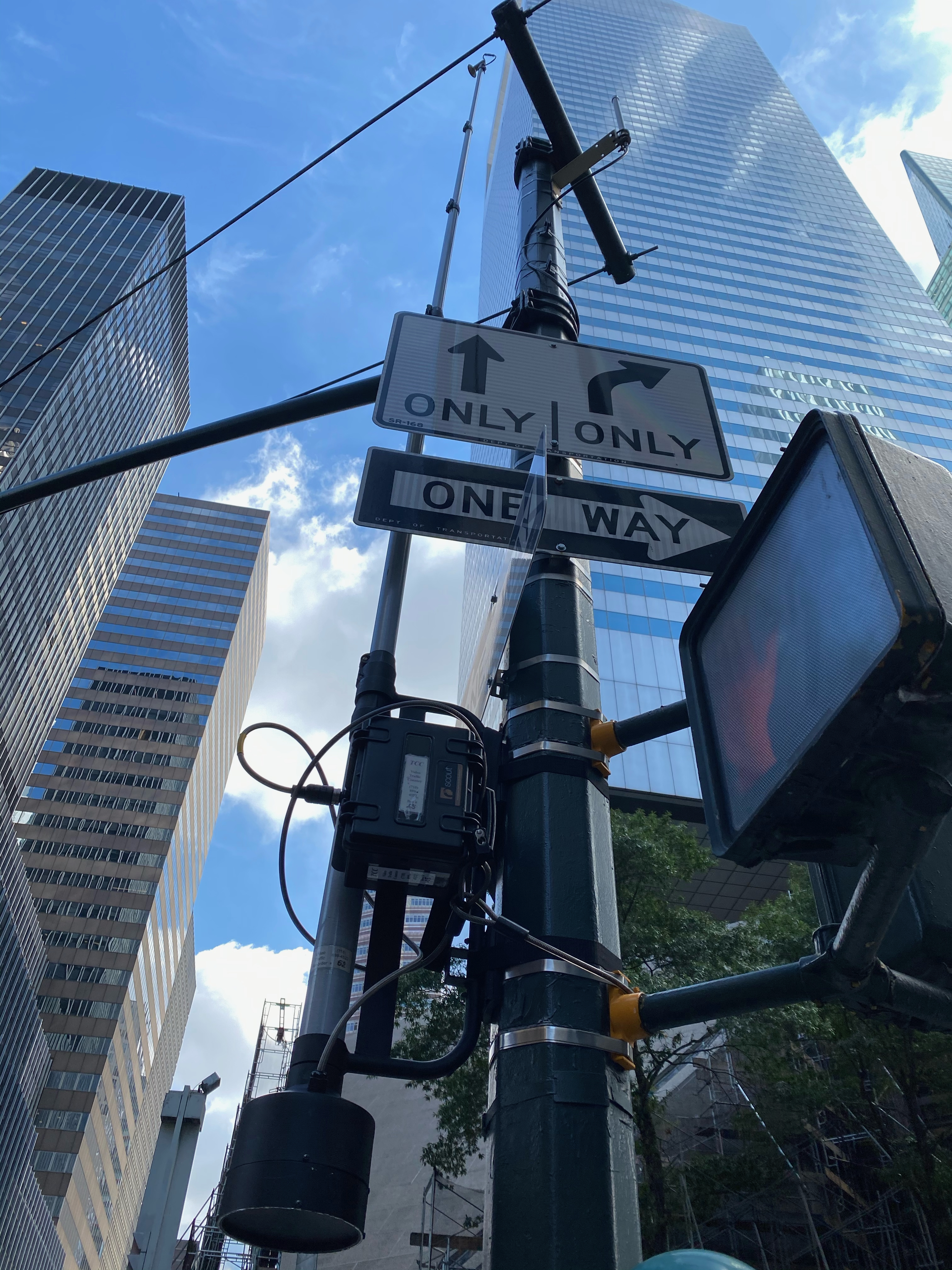
A portable video camera unit mounted to a traffic signal pole for traffic counting

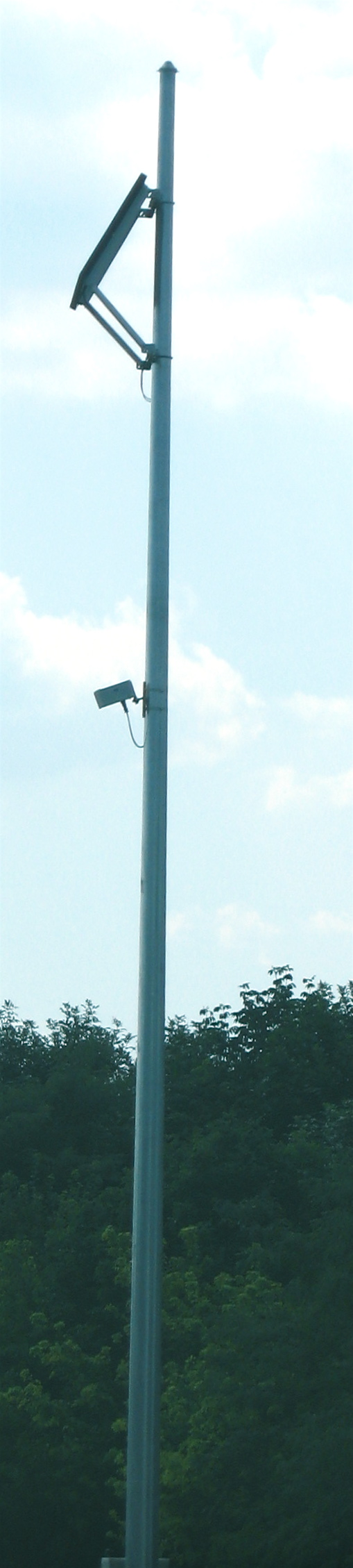
A radar-based traffic counter (about 2/3 of the way up the pole) powered by a solar panel (near top of pole)

A traffic counter is a device, often electronic in nature, used to count users (vehicles, bicycles, e-scooters & pedestrians), classify, and/or measure the speed of vehicular traffic passing along a given roadway. The device is usually deployed in near proximity to the roadway and uses an on-road medium, such as pneumatic road tubes laid across the roadway, piezo-electric sensors embedded in the roadway, inductive loops cut into the roadway, or a combination of these to detect the passing users. Pneumatic road tubes are generally used for temporary studies to study a sample of traffic, while piezo-electric sensors and inductive loops are used for permanent studies which can ascertain seasonal traffic trends and are often used in congestion monitoring on major roads. One of the first traffic counting units, called traffic recorders, was introduced in 1937, operated off a strip laid across the street, and used a six volt battery. Each hour it printed off a paper strip with the total for that hour. A newer type of temporary sensor consists of a metal detector and data recorder in a single package, adhered to the pavement in the center of a driving lane, unlike the pneumatic tube detector which cannot differentiate between lanes.

Recently, off-road technologies have been developed. These devices generally use some sort of transmitted energy such as radar waves or infrared beams to detect vehicles passing over the roadway. These methods are generally employed where vehicle speeds and volume are required without classification which require on-road sensors. Other off-road technologies are video image detection systems. A portable digital camera unit can be mounted to a pole and computer vision software is used to analyze traffic patterns including traffic counts.

Traffic count software can now also classify vehicles - recording numbers of cars, trucks, bikes etc as well as total numbers - as well as registering how many travelled that way before.

=== Bicycle and pedestrian traffic counting devices ===
Technologies for counting bicycles on roads, or bicycles and pedestrians along sidewalks or shared-use paths have progressed with the increased emphasis on the economic, environmental and social benefits of multi-modal traffic networks. Non-motorized modes of traffic are often surveyed using the same types of sensors used for motorized vehicles; in some cases tuned to be more sensitive to actuation (e.g. Pneumatic tubes, Piezoelectric, inductive loop detectors, Passive and Active Infrared, Video, Magnetometers, et al.).

In 2004, the American private-sector firm Alta Planning and Design, in partnership with the Institute of Transportation Engineers (ITE) initiated the National Bicycle and Pedestrian Documentation Program (NBPD) as an effort to promote greater data collection for non-motorized transportation modes, establish a consistent model for data collection, and address the lack of data access and shared research.

In 2013, the US Department of Transportation, Federal Highway Administration (FHWA) expanded and created a chapter on non-motorized counting for the Traffic Monitoring Guide (TMG) designed to guide planning agencies in the collection of their data.

== Turning movement count ==
A turning movement count or TMC is a type of traffic count that counts the flows of people and vehicles through an intersection. As with other traffic counts, these counts may be conducted on either a temporary or permanent basis and may use a variety of different technologies such as recorded video processed with image recognition algorithms or manual field collection assisted by tools like turning movement counters.

TMCs may classify different users of the intersection and provide separate counts for each. For example a TMC could provide separate movement counts for trucks, buses, other motor vehicles, cyclists, and pedestrians. Pedestrians, who don't use turning lanes in the roadway, may be counted differently such as when they cross the street in marked or unmarked crossings.

TMC's may be used to determine whether the intersection needs a traffic light. Formulas are used to decide whether the volume of the traffic determines that a light is needed. This equation is based on the road classification, entering speed and pedestrian/bicyclist movement through the intersection. A total of eight hours of turning movement is generally mandated for this type of assessment.

=== Turning movement counters ===
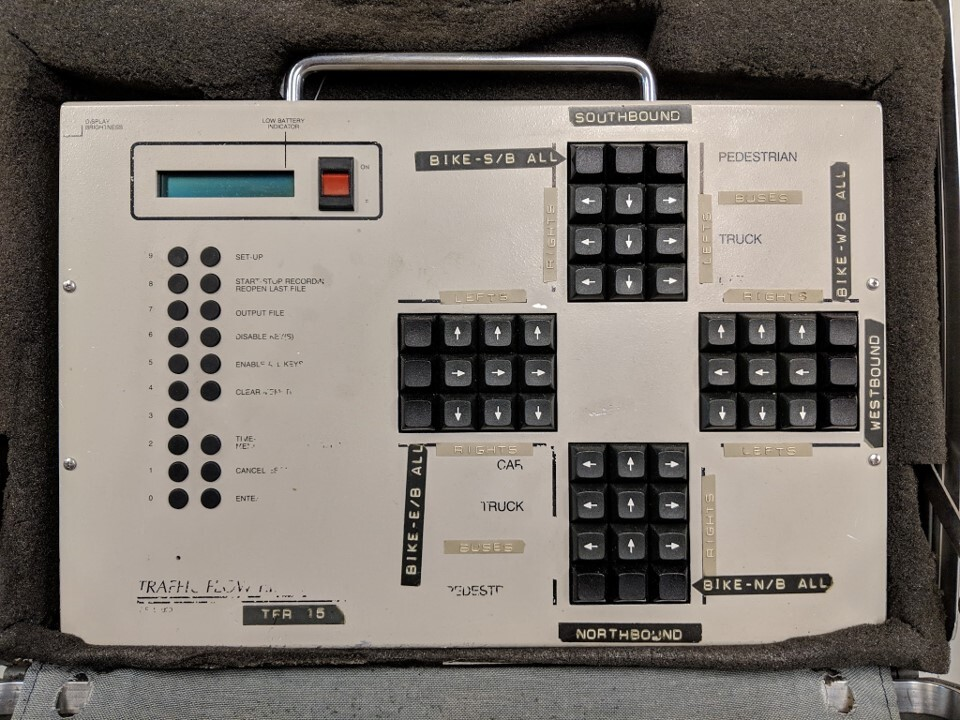
Device for manually recording a turning movement count

Turning movement counters (TMC's) are devices used to manually encode turning movement counts, a standard way of quantifying the movement of people and vehicles through an intersection.

TMC's are square shaped boxes that have buttons for each direction of traffic flow. For example, east bound traffic entering an intersection has a button for those vehicles that turn, left, right or continue straight. Furthermore, an additional button is used for each direction to add the number of pedestrian and bicyclist movement. Typically automated traffic counters assess traffic flows, however, due to the differing angles of vehicles entering an intersection the present technology available is not able to quantify the traffic without major error. Traditional automated traffic counters have rubber tubes which are laid out across the road generally in a straight portion in order to have the wheels on the same axle hit at about the same time. When turning in an intersection the tires hit individually and the amount of error in the counter is increased. This means that TMC's are the only present option for quantifying traffic flows. They are used manually by an individual pressing the correlating button for every vehicle that enters and moves through the intersection.

== See also ==
- People counter
- Passenger car equivalent
