= Human–city interaction =

Human–city interaction is the intersection between human–computer interaction and urban computing. The area involves data-driven methods such as analysis tools, prediction methods to present the solutions to urban design problems. Practitioners, Designers, software engineers in this area employ large sets of user-centric data to design urban environments with high levels of interactivity. This discipline mainly focuses on the user perspective and devises various interaction design between the citizen (user) and various urban entities. Common examples in the discipline include the interactivity between human and buildings, Interaction between Human and IoT devices, participatory and collective urban design, and so on. The discipline attracts growing interests from people of various background such as designers, urban planners, computer scientists, and even architecture. Although the design canvas between human and city is board, Lee et al. proposed a framework considering the multi-disciplinary interests (Urban, Computers and Human) together, in which the emerging technologies such as extended reality (XR) can serve as a platform for such co-design purposes.
