= Urban science =

Interdisciplinary field of study

Urban science is an interdisciplinary field that studies diverse urban issues and problems. Based on research findings of various disciplines such as history, economics, sociology, administration, architecture, urban engineering, transportation engineering, landscape architecture, environmental engineering, and geo-informatics, it aims to produce both theoretical and practical knowledge that contributes to understanding and solving urban issues in contemporary society.

Urban science uses a computational understanding of city systems to evaluate how they work and how they grow and change. Its aim is to make cities more habitable, resilient, and sustainable.

== History ==
Urban science became popular with the growth of urban cities and rapid population growth. In order to understand an urban city, scientists need to gather data and statistics that enable them to determine the urban population size, median age, dominant sex, number of children born per year, yearly death rate, and many other characteristics. This information enables urban scientists to predict future trends and changes, and to identify and hopefully mitigate urban challenges that are likely to arise. The more we know, the better we can prepare for the negative aspects of urban life.

The earliest signs of urban evolution appeared around 12,000 years ago. They coincided with advances in agriculture, which produced food surpluses that could be used to feed the inhabitants of towns and cities. The urban population increased dramatically over time, as towns and cities attracted an increasing proportion of the overall population. Cities are currently home to around 55% of the earth's inhabitants, but account for 70% of the earth's energy consumption, making them a major source of both air and water pollution.

== Urban Cities (Megacities) ==
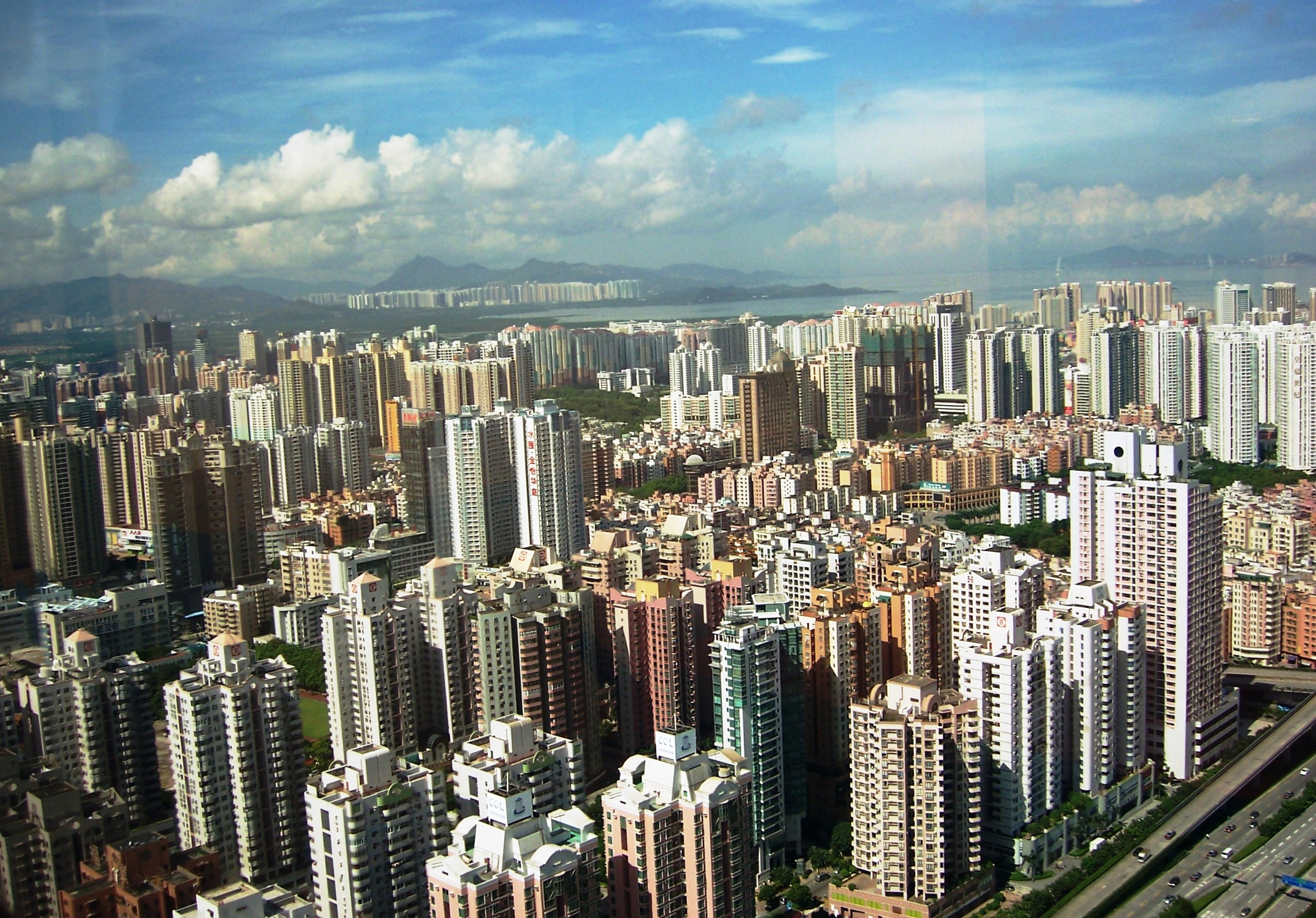
Shenzhenshi

The central object of urban science is the study of cities. While there was only one megacity in the world in 1950, namely New York with a population of 10 million people, 34 megacities have since been created. Tokyo is currently the largest megacity, with a population of 38 million people.

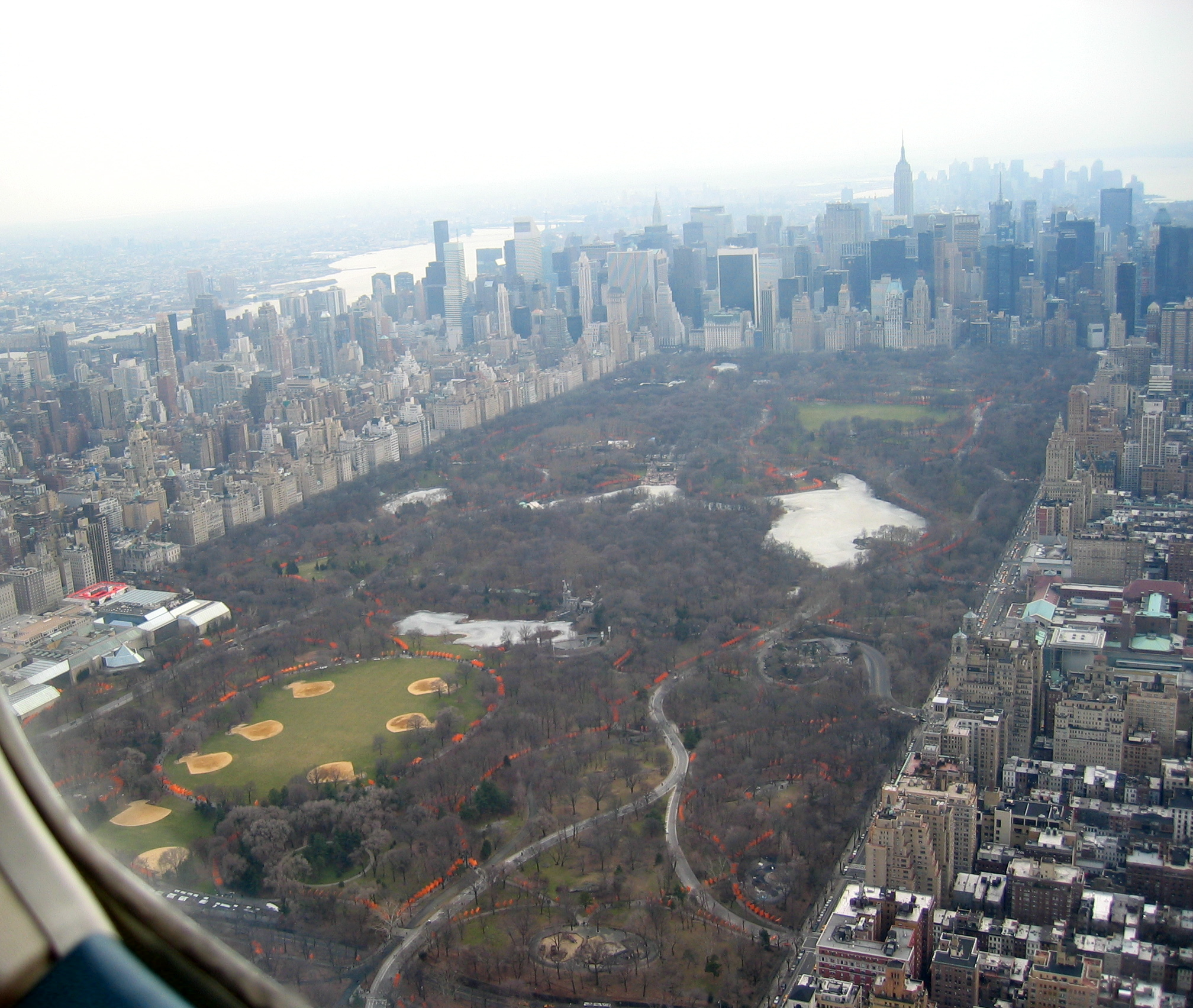
Central Park

Scientists currently consider megacities to be unsustainable.

Urban science seeks to help cities become sustainable and habitable. Not only does it try to avoid harming the planet, but it also seeks to reverse the negative effects urban cities have already had. Urban science is intended to enhance our understanding of the urban stressors placed on the earth during the building and facilitating of urban areas.

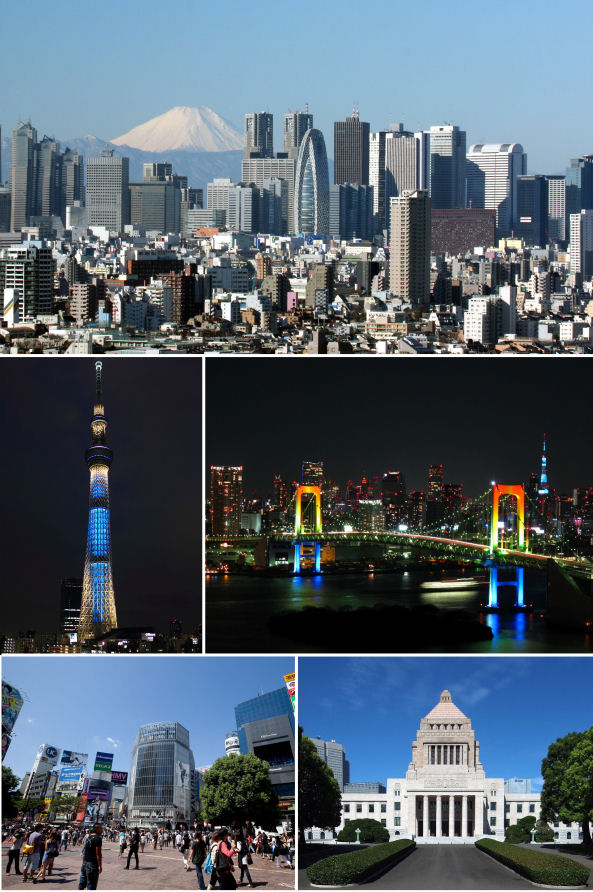
Tokyo Montage 2015

== Urban Challenges ==
Urbanization is occurring at a rapid pace, which places pressure on cities to provide good living conditions for human beings. The aim of urban science is to accomplish these goals without ruining the planet. Urban cities use renewable and non-renewable resources at an alarming rate. Non-renewable resources, such as fossil fuels, natural gases, and petroleum products, are by definition non-renewable and will no longer be available once they have all been consumed. Moreover, renewable resources, such as water, oxygen, trees, and solar energy, require sufficient time to replenish themselves, which they are not currently being given.

The current urban population is 3.9 billion people, which is expected to increase to 6 billion by 2045. Urban cities are threatened by major climate changes, and also be related events such as catastrophic storms and heat waves. They also face challenges of infrastructure development for a growing population, because the larger the population, the more housing is required for everyone. Increased construction increases the environmental changes, which impacts the climate and ecology. It also impacts the demographic characteristics of urban cities, with an increase in social inequalities, slums, and informal settlements.

== Environmental Considerations ==
From an environmental perspective, urban science offers a systematic way of looking at the impact of urbanization on the natural world. Not all environmentalists agree with urban science and ecology, due to the negative impact it can have on the environment. However, the majority agree on the importance of finding solutions that will make the planet more sustainable, while keeping urban cities habitable. They want to ensure that the planet will not suffer from the lasting effects of urbanization and over-consumption. While continuing to acknowledge the human need to live and grow, environmentalists seek solutions to human-created problems in order to help protect the planet.

Environmentalists want to teach the rest of society about the impact human beings have on the planet. They also seek ways to improve our environmental impact, and to prevent such destruction in the future. Christopher Emdin's 2010 journal article, Chapter Seven: What is Urban Education, indicates how urban science can be taught and used to our advantage in the future. The more we know as a society about urbanization and global changes, the more aware everyone will be of our negative environmental impact. This will spark modification around the globe.

If the earth continues to be further damaged by society and over-consumption, environmentalists want to be prepared to conceptualize and facilitate the answers that can correct the damage done. They hope to reverse a proportion of this damage and to protect the environment for future generations. A large component of urban science is the study of the current environment, particularly in cities, in order to find solutions for the problems the planet faces.
