= Page Hunt =

Page Hunt is a game developed by Bing for investigating human research behavior. It is a so-called "game with a purpose", as it pursues additional goals: not only to provide entertainment but also to harness human computation for some specific research task. The term "games with a purpose" was coined by Luis von Ahn, inventor of CAPTCHA, co-organizer of the reCAPTCHA project, and inventor of a famous ESP game.

== Game rules ==
Page Hunt is only accessible through Internet Explorer, and requires Silverlight (freely downloadable from the Page Hunt website).

Unlike the games of Luis von Ahn, Page Hunt is a single-player game. It does not support user registration (and hence does not rank players).

Shown a webpage, the player must find the best keyword or keywords which would bring this page to the list of top 5 search results by Bing. The higher the rank of the page within the first 5 results, the more points the player gets. Achieving this without frequent queries earns a bonus. The game lasts for 3 minutes.

== Scientific results ==
The data gained using Page Hunt has several applications:

1. providing metadata for pages,
2. providing query alterations for use in query refinement,
3. identifying ranking issues.

On testing a game internally, the following results were gathered (as described in “Page Hunt: Improving search engines using human computation games”): about 27% of the pages in the test database had 100% findability (it means that all the persons who were shown this page could bring it to the 5 best results), while almost the same number of pages (26%) were found by nobody. Thereby, a relation between the length URL and a webpage findability could be postulated: The longer the URL of the webpage, the harder it was to "hunt" it. Also the winning search queries were analyzed and classified. The queries that contain:

1. Spelling or punctuation alterations
2. Sitename to site alterations
3. Acronym/Initialism-Expansion alterations
4. Conceptual alterations

== See also ==
- Google Image Labeler
- Foldit
- ESP Game
