= Phetch =

Phetch is a game with a purpose intended to label images on the internet with descriptive captions suitable to assist sight impaired readers. Approximately 75% of the images on the web do not have proper ALT text labels, making them inaccessible through screen readers. The solution aimed at by Phetch is to label the images external to the web page rather than depending upon the web page author to create proper alt text for each image. Rather than paying people to do the mundane task of labeling images, Phetch aims to create a fun game that produces such descriptions as a side effect of having fun.

Phetch was created by Luis von Ahn and Shiry Ginosar of Carnegie Mellon University following the pattern set by the earlier ESP game.

Phetch is played by three to five people. One is designated as a describer, while the rest are seekers. The describer is shown an image, which he describes to the seekers. The seekers use an Internet image search engine to attempt to find the image being described. The first seeker to find the image gains points and becomes the describer for the next round. The describer is also rewarded for a successful outcome.

The data produced as the side effect of playing the game is the describer's descriptions of the image. An imagined system for serving these descriptions from a centralized server is described in the Phetch paper.

The output of the game was later used to improve image search engines and the game itself was later proposed as a mechanism to test interactive search interfaces.

In late 2008, public access to Phetch was discontinued when the ESP game was moved to the gwap.com domain. Peekaboom was also discontinued in late 2008.
