= Duolingo =

American educational technology company

Duolingo, Inc.

- Duolingo home page visited while logged out in April 2026
- Company type: Public
- Available in: Multilingual: Arabic; Bengali; Chinese (Mandarin); Czech; Dutch; English; French; German; Greek; Hindi; Hungarian; Indonesian; Italian; Japanese; Korean; Polish; Portuguese; Punjabi; Romanian; Russian; Spanish; Swedish; Tagalog; Tamil; Telugu; Thai; Turkish; Ukrainian; Urdu; Vietnamese
- Traded as: Nasdaq: DUOL (Class A); S&P 400 component
- Founded: 2011; 15 years ago
- Headquarters: Pittsburgh, Pennsylvania, U.S.
- Area served: Worldwide
- Founders: Luis von Ahn; Severin Hacker
- Key people: Luis von Ahn (CEO); Severin Hacker (CTO)
- Industry: Online education
- Products: Duolingo; Duolingo ABC; Duolingo English Test
- Services: Language, music, chess, and math courses and language assessment.
- Revenue: ▲US$1.04 billion (2025)
- Net income: ▲US$414.1 million (2025)
- Employees: ≈ 830 (December 2024)
- Website: duolingo.com
- Advertising: Yes
- Registration: Yes (Note: One can use Duolingo for a few lessons before requiring an account to progress.)
- Users: 130 million MAU (Q1 2025)
- Launched: November 27, 2011; 14 years ago (private beta); June 19, 2012; 14 years ago (public release)
- Current status: Online
- Native clients on: Android, iOS, iPadOS

Duolingo, Inc. (Note: Pronunciation: /ˌdjuːoʊˈlɪŋɡoʊ/ (DEW-oh-LING-goh)) is an American educational technology company that produces learning apps and provides language certification. Duolingo offers courses on 42 languages, ranging from English, French, and Spanish to less commonly studied languages such as Hawaiian, Scottish Gaelic, and Navajo, and even constructed languages such as Esperanto, Klingon and High Valyrian It also offers courses on music, math, and chess. The learning method incorporates gamification to motivate users with points, rewards and interactive lessons featuring spaced repetition. The app promotes short, daily lessons for consistent, phased practice.

Duolingo also offers the Duolingo English Test, an online language assessment, and Duolingo ABC, a literacy app designed for children. The company follows a freemium model, where some content is provided for free with advertising, and users can pay for ad-free services which provide additional features.

== History ==
=== Early history ===
The idea of Duolingo was formulated in 2009 by Carnegie Mellon University professor Luis von Ahn and his Swiss-born post-graduate student Severin Hacker. Von Ahn had sold his second company, reCAPTCHA, to Google and, with Hacker, wanted to work on an education-related project. Von Ahn stated that he saw how expensive it was for people in his community in Guatemala to learn English. Hacker (co-founder and current CTO of Duolingo) believed that "free education will really change the world" and wanted to provide an accessible means for doing so. He was recognized by the National Inventors Hall of Fame for his contributions to language learning and technological development. The Duo mascot is a green owl because co-founder Severin Hacker hates the color green.

The project was originally financed by von Ahn's MacArthur fellowship and a National Science Foundation grant. The founders considered creating Duolingo as a nonprofit organization, but von Ahn judged this model unsustainable. Its early revenue stream, a crowdsourced translation service, was replaced by a Duolingo English Test certification program, advertising, and subscription.

=== Funds ===
Duolingo logo from 2011 to 2019

In October 2011, Duolingo announced that it had raised $3.3 million from a Series A round of funding, led by Union Square Ventures, with participation from author Tim Ferriss and actor Ashton Kutcher's investing firm A-Grade Investments. Duolingo launched a private beta on November 30, 2011, and accumulated a waiting list of more than 100,000 people by December 13. It launched to the general public on June 19, 2012, at which point the waiting list had grown to around 500,000.

In September 2012, Duolingo announced that it had raised a further $15 million from a Series B funding round led by New Enterprise Associates, with participation from Union Square Ventures. In November 2012, Duolingo released an iPhone app, followed by an Android app in May 2013, at which time Duolingo had around 3 million users. By July 2013, it had grown to 5 million users and was rated the No. 1 free education app in the Google Play Store.

In February 2014, Duolingo announced that it had raised $20 million from a Series C funding round led by Kleiner Caufield & Byers, with prior investors also participating. At this time, it had 34 employees, and reported about 25 million registered users and 12.5 million active users; it later reported a figure closer to 60 million users.

In June 2015, Duolingo announced that it had raised $45 million from a Series D funding round led by Google Capital, bringing its total funding to $83.3 million. The round valued the company at around $470 million, with 100 million registered users globally. In April 2016, it was reported that Duolingo had more than 18 million monthly users.

In July 2017, Duolingo announced that it had raised $25 million in a Series E funding round led by Drive Capital, bringing its total funding to $108.3 million. The round valued Duolingo at $700 million, and the company reported passing 200 million registered users, with 25 million active users. It was reported that Duolingo had 95 employees. Funds from the Series E round would be directed toward creating initiatives such as a related educational flashcard app, TinyCards, and testbeds for initiatives related to reading and listening comprehension. On August 1, 2018, Duolingo surpassed 300 million registered users.

In December 2019, it was announced that Duolingo raised $30 million in a Series F funding round from Alphabet's investment company, CapitalG. The round valued Duolingo at $1.5 billion. Duolingo reported 30 million active users at this time. The headcount at the company had increased to around two hundred, and new offices had been opened in Seattle, New York, and Beijing. Duolingo planned to use the funds to develop new products and further expand its team in sectors like engineering, business development, design, curriculum and content creators, community outreach, and marketing.

=== Features and media ===
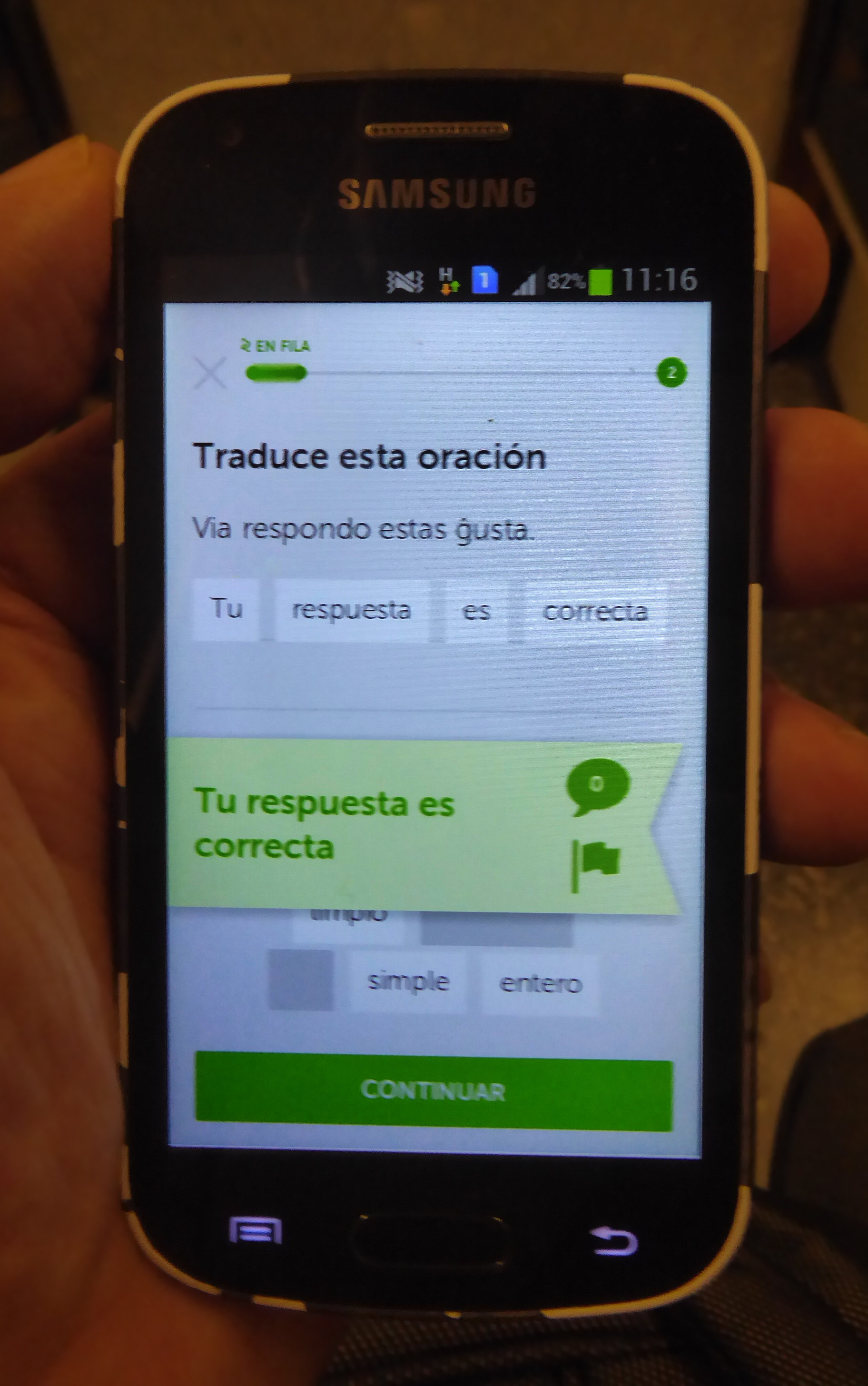
An Esperanto lesson on Duolingo in 2017 being taught to a Spanish speaker

In October 2013, Duolingo launched a crowdsourced language incubator. Initially relying on volunteers developing its courses, in March 2021 Duolingo announced that it would be ending its volunteer contributor program. The company said that language courses would instead be maintained and developed by professional linguists aligning with CEFR standards. On June 28, 2021, Duolingo filed for an initial public offering on NASDAQ under the ticker DUOL. From August 2021 to June 2022, the Duolingo language learning app was removed from some app stores in China. In March 2022, Duolingo discontinued its community forums.

In August 2022, Duolingo overhauled its interface, changing its course structure from a tree-like design, where users could choose from a range of lessons after completing previous ones, to a linear progression. This update has been criticized by users across social media outlets, such as Reddit and X (formerly Twitter). CEO Luis von Ahn stated that there were no plans to reverse the changes.

In October 2022, Duolingo acquired Detroit-based animation studio Gunner, a long-time design and animation partner that had produced graphics and animations for Duolingo, Duolingo ABC, and the company's marketing campaigns.

In March 2023, Duolingo officially announced the planned Duolingo Max, a subscription tier above Super Duolingo, in their blog. In October 2023, Duolingo released math and music courses in English and Spanish for iOS users.

In January 2024, Duolingo fired around ten percent of its contract workforce and announced plans to replace them with AI. The company acquired Detroit-based design studio Hobbes in March.

In August 2025, Duolingo announced plans to expand its music education offerings after acquiring London-based NextBeat, a music and gaming start-up company.

== Products and services ==
=== Courses ===
==== Language courses ====
CEFR based language courses for learners of English, Spanish, French, Italian, Chinese (Mandarin), Japanese, Korean, Portuguese, and German are available for all users. Additional courses are also available for speakers of English (Arabic, Czech, Danish, Dutch, Esperanto, Finnish, Greek, Haitian Creole, Hawaiian, Hebrew, High Valyrian, Hindi, Hungarian, Indonesian, Irish, Klingon, Latin, Navajo, Norwegian, Polish, Romanian, Russian, Scottish Gaelic, Swahili, Swedish, Turkish, Ukrainian, Vietnamese, Welsh, Yiddish, Zulu), Chinese (Chinese (Cantonese)), Arabic (Swedish), and Spanish (Catalan, Russian, Swedish).

=== Subscriptions ===
==== Super Duolingo ====
As of 2014, most of Duolingo's language learning features are free with advertising. Users can remove advertising by paying a subscription fee or promoting referral links. The paid user program, Super Duolingo (formerly known as Duolingo Plus), offers unlimited retries and access to some additional types of lessons. Super Duolingo users can also have video chats with Duolingo characters Lily and Falstaff, powered by generative AI software, a feature formerly exclusive to Duolingo Max.

==== Duolingo Max ====
Duolingo Max was a subscription above Super Duolingo that added additional functions using generative AI where users could roleplay with an AI conversation partner and have Zoom-style video chats with the characters. Max users could also use AI to help understand their mistakes, a feature that was made free for all users in 2026. As of November 2026, Duolingo Max has been sunsetted, and all Max features have been moved to Super Duolingo.

==== Duolingo for Schools ====
Duolingo for Schools is designed to help teachers use Duolingo in their classrooms. It allows teachers to create classrooms, assign lessons, track student progress, and personalize learning. However, Duolingo decided to sunset the program in 2027.

=== Duolingo English Test ===
The Duolingo English Test (DET) is an online English proficiency test that measures proficiency in reading, writing, speaking, and listening in English. It is a computer-based test scored on a scale of 10–160, with scores above 120 considered English proficiency. The test's questions algorithmically adjust to the test-takers' ability level.

=== Other programs ===
Duolingo Math was an app course for learning elementary mathematics. It was announced on YouTube on August 27, 2022. It was merged into Duolingo in 2024, now available as a course.

On October 11, 2023, the company released Duolingo Music, a new platform within the existing app that provides basic music learning through piano and sheet music lessons.

Duolingo introduced chess lessons starting on April 22, 2025. The lessons gradually increasing in difficulty. In 2026, Duolingo launched a feature allowing players to play against each other, and as of early 2026 had seven million daily active users.

Duolingo ABC is a free app designed for young children to learn letters, their sounds, phonics, and other early reading concepts. Released in 2020, it does not contain ads or in-app purchases. As of April 2024, iOS and Android versions were available, but only in English.

== Learning model ==
=== Exercises and pacing ===
On Duolingo, learners learn by doing, engaging with the course material. Lessons are designed to be brief, allowing users to learn in manageable chunks. Duolingo uses a gamified approach to learning, with lessons that incorporate translating, interactive exercises, quizzes, and stories. It also uses an algorithm that adapts to each learner and can provide personalized feedback and recommendations.

=== Gamification ===
Duolingo provides a competitive space, such as in leagues, where people can compete with randomly selected groupings of up to 30 users. Leagues: Bronze, Silver, Gold, Sapphire, Ruby, Emerald, Amethyst, Pearl, Obsidian, Diamond. Rankings in leagues are determined by the number of experience points earned in a week. Badges in Duolingo represent achievements earned from completing specific objectives. Users can also create their own avatars and as of 2026 users can add seasonal suits to their avatars.

Any lesson completed in Duolingo will count towards the user's daily streak. The daily streak's visual symbol in the app is fire. Duolingo's "Friend Streak" lets users maintain streaks with up to five friends. Streaks encourage consistent daily practice and help build a habit of regular learning.

The app has a personalized bandit algorithm system (later the A/B tested variant recovering difference softmax algorithm) that determines the daily notification that will be sent out to the user.

=== Duolingo Score ===
The Duolingo Score is an estimate of users' proficiency in the language they are learning in CEFR-aligned courses. The Duolingo Score provides a granular assessment of what a user has learned and what they can do with the language. As of June 2026, languages in the Duolingo app are represented with Duolingo Scores, though they are still shown in the website as aligned with the CEFR standards. The DET also uses a similar scoring system. Users can also display their Duolingo Scores to their LinkedIn profile in the event a job requires employees to be bilingual. The most developed CEFR-aligned courses (French, English, and Spanish) cover the Duolingo Score from 0 to 130.

Duolingo Score	CEFR level	Students can...
0–9	very early A1	use simple words and phrases in some common scenarios.
10–19	early A1	talk about themselves and where they live and ask and answer simple questions.
20–29	high A1	discuss their daily routine, order food at a restaurant, and chat a little.
30–59	A2	have basic conversations about familiar topics, including weather, shopping, hobbies, and holiday plans.
60–79	early B1	handle common situations while traveling, ask for directions, and make reservations.
80–99	high B1	share their opinion, tell stories, and navigate most daily situations.
100–114	early B2	have deep discussions about their interests and understand news, movies, and jokes.
115–129	high B2	express themselves in most situations and uses the language in professional and academic scenarios.
130–160	C1 and C2	easily understand all that they hear or read and expresses nuanced thoughts in sophisticated language.

== Business model ==
Duolingo operates on a freemium business model, offering free access to its learning platforms with ads. Revenue is primarily generated through subscriptions, which remove ads, and provide other perks like unlimited energy (formerly hearts) and generative AI. The app also generates income from in-app purchases of virtual currency (Gems) and power-ups that enhance the learning experience. Another key revenue stream is the Duolingo English Test (DET), a low-cost English proficiency test.

In April 2020, it passed one million paid subscribers; it reached 2.9 million in March 2022, and 4.8 million at the end of March 2023. As of June 2025, Duolingo has 10.9 million paying subscribers.

Duolingo had revenue of $531 million in 2023, compared to $250.77 million in 2021, $36 million in 2018, $13 million in 2017, and $1 million in 2016. In May 2022, it was reported that 6.8% of its monthly active users paid for the ad-free version of the app.

=== Generative AI usage ===
Starting from 2024, Duolingo began to cut some of their staff following steps to incorporate AI into its platform. In April 2025, Duolingo launched 148 new language courses developed using generative AI, substantially expanding the number of courses available on the platform. This move caused controversy with language researchers stating that the use of AI-generated content could take work away from future translators, as the courses would lose nuance in social-cultural aspects of certain languages that AI models cannot understand.

In addition, company executives were questioned about statements indicating that the use of AI is much more effective than human teaching. These comments were removed from much of Duolingo's social media following backlash from users as well as professional translators.

In 2025, CEO Luis von Ahn announced Duolingo would become an "AI-first" company and would be replacing contracted workers with artificial intelligence through automation. This decision was met with public outcry, leading many users to unsubscribe and end their learning streaks in protest. Many criticized the Duolingo app for losing its quality due to this change.

In May 2025, due to backlash against the perceived threat of workers being replaced by inferior-quality AI, Duolingo's Instagram and TikTok videos were flooded with comments expressing anger at the company. Duolingo took down all videos from both channels. Duolingo's social media accounts had previously been described as models of success in marketing. The company later uploaded a video which sarcastically attempted to downplay the controversy, followed by a video from the CEO attempting to clarify the company's use of generative AI technology. When asked about the backlash during Duolingo's August 2025 earnings call, CEO Luis von Ahn said: "We just don't believe that the effect of this is very material in terms of when you're looking at actual financial metrics."

== Reception ==
=== Effectiveness ===
A 2017 study found no significant difference between elementary students learning Spanish through the "gamification" of the Duolingo app and those learning in classroom environments, with both groups demonstrating a similar increase in achievements and self-efficacy.

Duolingo's occasional use of 'erratic' phrases—such as "The bride is a woman and the groom is a hedgehog" or "The man eats ice cream with mustard"—is reportedly derived from research published in 2018 by psychologists at Ghent University in Belgium, which concluded that such "semantically unpredictable sentences" were more effective for language learning than conventional and predictable phrases, based on the concept of "reward prediction errors", in which unexpected or surprising outcomes are more rewarding and thus encourage further learning.

A 2022 study on adults using Duolingo as their only language learning tool, published in the journal Foreign Language Annals, found that participants who completed a course had similar reading and listening proficiency to university students after four semesters of study, concluding that Duolingo could be an effective tool for language learning. Another 2022 study of Malaysian students learning French, published by the National University of Malaysia Press, found that the app facilitated the acquisition of vocabulary and concluded that it was "well suited" for beginners in this regard.

According to Duolingo's own 2021 study, five sections of the app are roughly equivalent to five semesters of university instruction, and Duolingo is an "effective tool [...] at an intermediate level". A 2023 study funded by Duolingo concluded that Duolingo English learners did not significantly learn much grammar. Duolingo English learners in Colombia and Spain were found to gain significantly more proficiency than students in a classroom, except for listening.

=== Criticism ===
Some language professionals have criticized the app for its limitations and gamified design. Users have also reported that "gamification" has led to cheating, hacking, and incentivized game strategies that conflict with actual learning.

In January 2023, Duolingo's data on over 2.6 million users' usernames, names, and phone numbers was sold in a hacker forum. Duolingo later stated that they would investigate the "dark web post". They concluded that the data was obtained by scraping publicly available information based on an exposed application programming interface (API). Duolingo's spokesperson states that the API is intentionally publicly visible.

Since the end of October 2023, Duolingo has stopped updating its Welsh course to "focus on languages in higher demand". Some users criticized this decision because it came at the expense of learners of a language with limited resources on the market and the potential halting of the Welsh Government's "Cymraeg 2050" strategy to promote Welsh language learning.

Bruno Estigarribia stated that, as of 2019, the Guarani course was "seemingly in a development phase" and that it "had many inconsistencies". He added this course could serve as a complement to one's studies, but it would not "magically teach" the language.

In January 2024, Duolingo fired about 10% of contractors, stating that "Generative AI is accelerating our work by helping us create new content dramatically faster."

In April 2025, Duolingo announced they would gradually stop using contractors where "AI" can do the work, urging employees to "take occasional small hits on quality [rather] than move slowly and miss the moment" in order to become an "AI-first" company. This statement was received poorly, and a follow-up post, where the CEO claims he was misunderstood, led to further critique.

=== Awards ===
In 2013, Apple named Duolingo as its "iPhone App of the Year". Duolingo won "Best Education Startup" at the 2014 Crunchies, and was the most downloaded education app in Google Play in 2013 and 2014. In 2026, Duolingo was ranked 41 in Time Magazine's World Most Impactful Companies.

In 2015, the Duolingo company won the Index Award in the Play & Learning category.

== Image and brand ==
=== Duolingo's characters ===
Duo, the mascot of Duolingo

Duolingo has brand characters that are used for engagement and creating storylines. The main character is Duo Keyshauna Renee Lingo, commonly known as Duo or Duo the Owl, the company's green owl mascot. On February 11, 2025, Duolingo announced, as part of a publicity stunt, that Duo had died, after being hit by a Tesla Cybertruck. Later, Duolingo put up a website where the users of the app would have to work together to obtain 50 Billion in-app experience to resurrect Duo. After the goal was reached, Duolingo posted a video on social media of Duo's resurrection. The company also said that the owl, whose full name is Duo Keyshauna Renee Lingo, was born in 1000BC. According to Duolingo Brand Guidelines, "Duo is a boy" and communicates through text only. Besides Duo, Duolingo's brand characters include Zari, Bea, Lily, Lucy, Lin, Oscar, Eddy, Junior, Vikram, Priti and Falstaff. (Note: Attributed to multiple sources:)

In October 2026, Duolingo released DuoTV, an animated miniseries produced by their in-house studio featuring Duo, Falstaff, Lily and Zari working together in a kombini. Other Duolingo characters make appearances as well. The episodes were made available for free on Duolingo's YouTube channel.

=== In popular culture ===
Due to the app's frequent reminder notifications, Duolingo's mascot, a green cartoon owl named Duo, has been the subject of Internet memes antagonizing him, with the character often depicted stalking or threatening users if they do not continue using the app.

Duolingo has leaned into its online reputation and has adjusted its social media and marketing strategies accordingly. Acknowledging the meme, Duolingo released a video on April Fools' Day 2019, depicting a facetious new feature called "Duolingo Push". In the video, users of "Duolingo Push" are reminded to use the app by Duo himself (depicted by a person wearing a Duolingo mascot costume), who stares at and follows them until they comply. It was also acknowledged during Duolingo's 2022 April Fools' Day video, "Lawyer Fights Duolingo Owl for $2,700,000", where a fictitious law firm fights for those that have been harmed by Duolingo's owl mascot. This was further referenced by the company in its 2024 April Fools' Day skit "Duo on Ice", in which the owl, in a mix of Spanish and English, admitted to having an appetite for human flesh, and if the user failed to continue their streak, they would "eat their head like a praying mantis."

In November 2019, Saturday Night Live parodied Duolingo in a sketch where adults learned to communicate with children by using a fictitious course called "Duolingo for Talking to Children".

In 2024, Duolingo partnered with Webtoon to create a webcomic called Duo Unleashed based on the app's characters on Webtoon's website. In 2026, a second series titled Duo Leveling was released.

In November 2026, Duolingo's legal team asked a fan artist on X to remove lascivious images of their character Lily. While no official reason has been given, Lily is characterized as a teenager, which may potentially be a reason for the takedown. Duolingo has previously made suggestive jokes and social media posts using their main mascot Duo. The removal of this fan art triggered backlash amongst X users, suggesting that Duolingo was creating a Streisand Effect by suppressing the posts.

== Offices and workforce ==
Duolingo is headquartered in Pittsburgh, Pennsylvania. Duo's Taqueria is an adjacent taco stand operated by Duolingo. The restaurant encourages patrons to order in Spanish. Duolingo's taco shop brought in $700,000 in 2023.

In 2024, Duolingo opened a new office in New York City.

Duolingo also has offices in Seattle, Detroit, Beijing, and Berlin.

As of October 2024, Duolingo employs around 850 people.

== See also ==
- Distance education
- Language assessment
- Language education
- Language pedagogy
- Mathematics education
- Music education
