= Confirmation code =

A confirmation code is a short piece of data (code, cypher) that is used for purposes of confirmation of a particular attribute or property such as personally identifiable information.

- CAPTCHA - a computing scheme used to identity an entity as a human being and not a program, employing the current differences in text recognition capability between humans and computers.
- Multi-factor authentication
- The term "shibboleth" from the Bible was employed for this purpose, by usage of the property that the "sh" phoneme was an identifying mark.
