= Guess the Correlation =

Browser game research project

- Developer(s): Omar Wagih
- Initial release: 2016
- Available in: English
- Type: Game with a purpose, Browser game
- Website: guessthecorrelation.com

Guess the Correlation is a minimalistic browser-based game with a purpose developed in 2016 by Omar Wagih at the European Bioinformatics Institute. The game was developed to study human perception in scatter plots. Players are presented with a stream of scatter plots depicting the relationship between two random variables and are asked to guess how positively correlated they are. Guesses closer to the real correlation are rewarded more points. The game features both single and two-player modes and has a retro 8-bit design and sound effects.

Collected guesses are used to better understand how humans perceive correlations in scatter plots by identifying features within scatter plots, such as outliers, that cause players to over or under estimate the true correlation.

By 1 February 2016, over 2 million guesses had been collected from 100,000 participants.

== Gameplay ==
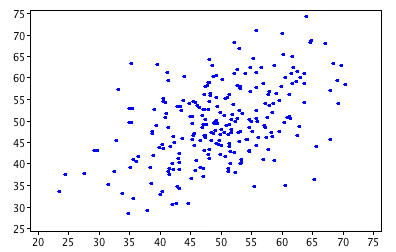
A scatter plot of the type used in the game. This scatterplot displays a correlation of r=.24

In the single-player mode, players are presented with a stream of scatter plots depicting the relationship between two random variables. The aim is to guess the true Pearson correlation coefficient, where the guess can range from 0 (no correlation) to 1 (perfect positive correlation). Players start out with three lives and no points. Guesses made within 0.05 of the true correlation are awarded a life and five points. Guesses made within 0.10 are awarded one point, and guesses over 0.10 are not awarded any points and a life is deducted. The game ends when the player has run out of lives.

In the two player mode, opponents challenge each other at guessing the true correlation. Once a session has been initiated between two players, both players are presented with the same scatter plot. The player with the closest guess to true correlation is awarded a point. In the event of a draw, no points are awarded to either player. The first player to reach 10 points is declared the winner.

== See also ==
- Citizen science
- Game with a purpose
- List of crowdsourcing projects
