= Nigel Cross =

British design researcher (born 1942)

Nigel Cross (born 1942) is a British academic, a design researcher and educator, Emeritus Professor of Design Studies at The Open University, United Kingdom, where he was responsible for developing the first distance-learning courses in design in the early 1970s. He was an editor of the journal Design Studies from its inception in 1979, Editor in Chief 1984-2017 and Emeritus Editor in Chief 2018-23. Cross helped clarify and develop the concept of design thinking (or "designerly ways of knowing") related to the development of design as an academic discipline. He is one of the key people of the Design Research Society.

== Education ==
Nigel Cross studied architecture at the University of Bath 1961-1966. He then took an MSc course in Industrial Design Technology, run by the leading design methodologist John Christopher Jones, at the University of Manchester Institute of Science of Technology (1967). In 1974 he also completed a PhD at UMIST in computer aided design.

== Research ==
Nigel Cross began his design research in the 1960s with studies of "simulated" computer-aided design systems where the purported simulator was actually a human operator, using text and graphical communication via CCTV. Cross later referred to this as a kind of Reverse Turing test; in interaction design this kind of study later became known as a Wizard of Oz experiment. He also applied early forms of protocol analysis to these experiments. His PhD on ‘Human and Machine Roles in Computer Aided Design’ was expanded into the book The Automated Architect (1977), which was critical of some of the computer-aided architectural design work of that time. In 1971, Cross co-organised the first major conference of the Design Research Society (DRS), on Design Participation. He continued to play significant roles in DRS, and was its President from 2006-2017.

Early interests in design methods led to an edited book of foundational papers, Developments in Design Methodology (1984) and a textbook of Engineering Design Methods (1989, now in a 5th edition).

Subsequently his research interests turned more to design cognition or design thinking. In 1991 Cross established, with colleagues at Delft University of Technology, the international series of Design Thinking Research Symposia (DTRS). The second DTRS meeting at Delft (1994) laid the foundations for much subsequent work on protocol and other studies of design activity.

== Writings ==
In 1982 Cross published a journal article 'Designerly Ways of Knowing', drawing on design research to show Design as having its own intellectual and practical culture as a basis for education, and contrasting it with cultures of Science and Arts & Humanities. This was a clarification of the idea that "There are things to know, ways of knowing them and ways of finding out about them that are specific to the design area". The paper established the concept of design as a discipline, now widely adopted in modern design theory, education and practice.

In subsequent papers, Cross continued to identify and clarify the cognitive and practical skills underlying design thinking, and the nature of expertise in design.

With Kees Dorst, Cross advanced the concept of 'co-evolution' in design, observing how designers progress a project by developing the problem space and solution space in parallel, with activities in each 'space' cross-fertilising the other. Understanding "how designers think and work" has been a significant theme in his writings, culminating in the book Design Thinking (2011, now in a 2nd edition).

=== Books ===
- Design Participation (editor), Academy Editions, London, 1972.
- The Automated Architect: human and machine roles in design, Pion Ltd., London, 1977. ISBN 0850860571
- Developments in Design Methodology (editor), John Wiley and Sons Ltd., Chichester, 1984. ISBN 0471102482
- Research in Design Thinking (co-editor with K. Dorst and N. Roozenburg), Delft University Press, Delft, 1992. ISBN 9062757960
- Analysing Design Activity (co-editor with H. Christiaans and K. Dorst), John Wiley & Sons Ltd., Chichester, 1996. ISBN 0471960608
- Designerly Ways of Knowing, Springer, London, 2006. ISBN 1846283000; ISBN 9781849965736
- Engineering Design Methods: strategies for product design (fifth edition), John Wiley and Sons Ltd., Chichester and New York, 2021. ISBN 9781119724377
- Design Thinking: understanding how designers think and work (second edition), Bloomsbury, Oxford and New York, 2023. ISBN 9781350305069; ISBN 9781350305021
- Designerly Ways of Knowing and Thinking (second edition), Springer, London, 2025. ISBN 9781447175407

== Awards ==
- 2005. Lifetime Achievement Award, Design Research Society.
- 2007. Elected Honorary Fellow, The Design Society.
- 2012. Institution of Engineering Designers Trophy award for outstanding contributions to design education and research.

== Personal life ==
Nigel Cross was married to Anita Clayburn Cross (died 2023). She was an educationist and they worked together on design education and the study of expert designers, publishing several papers together, and Anita also published independently.
