= Duolingo English Test =

Online English proficiency test

- Acronym: DET
- Type: Internet-based standardized test
- Administrator: Duolingo
- Skills tested: English proficiency
- Purpose: To assess the English language proficiency of non-native English speakers
- Year started: 2016; 10 years ago
- Duration: ~1 hour
- Score range: 10–160
- Score validity: 2 years
- Regions: International
- Languages: English
- Fee: US$70 (2026)
- Website: englishtest.duolingo.com

The Duolingo English Test (DET) is a standardized test of the English language designed to be internet-based rather than paper-based. The DET is an adaptive test that uses an algorithm to adapt the difficulty of the test to the test-taker. It was developed by Duolingo in 2014 as Test Center and grew in popularity and acceptance at universities during the COVID-19 pandemic. Ireland accepts the test as part of its student visa program. Some universities in the United Kingdom, such as the London School of Economics, Imperial College London, Kingston University, the University of Southampton, and Middlesex University, also accept the Duolingo English Test. Others, such as Oxford University, Cambridge University and Lancaster University do not currently accept the Duolingo English Test.

The Duolingo English Test is scored on a scale of 10–160, with scores above 120 considering the test taker to be proficient in English.

== Comparison to other scoring systems ==
| TOEFL iBT Total Score (0–120) | IELTS Band (0–9) | Duolingo English Test Score (10–160) | CEFR |
|---|---|---|---|
| 120 | 8.5–9 | 160 | C2 |
| 119 | 8 | 155 | C2 |
| 117–118 | 8 | 150 | C1 |
| 113–116 | 7.5 | 145 | C1 |
| 109–112 | 7.5 | 140 | C1 |
| 104–108 | 7 | 135 | C1 |
| 98–103 | 7 | 130 | C1 |
| 93–97 | 6.5 | 125 | B2 |
| 87–92 | 6.5 | 120 | B2 |
| 82–86 | 6 | 115 | B2 |
| 76–81 | 6 | 110 | B2 |
| 70–75 | 6 | 105 | B2 |
| 65–69 | 5.5 | 100 | B2 |
| 59–64 | 5.5 | 95 | B1 |
| 53–58 | 5 | 90 | B1 |
| 47–52 | 5 | 85 | B1 |
| 41–46 | 5 | 80 | B1 |
| 35–40 | 4.5 | 75 | B1 |
| 30–34 | 4.5 | 70 | B1 |
| 24–29 | 4.5 | 65 | B1 |
| 17–23 | 4 | 55–60 | B1 |
| 1–16 | 1–3.5 | 10–50 | A1 – A2 |
| 0 | 0 | N/A | N/A |
Sample: TOEFL iBT data included 328 official score reports and 1,095 self-reported scores. IELTS Academic data included 1,643 official score reports and 4,420 self-reported scores

- Note: the above scores are provided by Duolingo, the company that creates the DET.

== See also ==
- English as a second or foreign language
- International Student Admissions Test (ISAT)
- National Accreditation Authority for Translators and Interpreters (NAATI)
- Teaching English as a second or foreign language (TEFL)
