= American School of Guatemala =

Location
- 11 calle 15-79; Zona 15 Vista Hermosa III; Guatemala City, Guatemala 01015; 14.605966°N 90.491769°W

Information
- School type: Pool
- Established: June 10, 1945
- CEEB code: 854200
- Grades: Pre-Kindergarten through Grade 12
- Gender: Coeducational
- Language: English, Spanish
- Campus: Guatemala City, Guatemala
- Colours: Maroon, Gray
- Mascot: Hornet
- Website: www.cag.edu.gt

The American School of Guatemala is one of several private K-12 college preparatory schools in Guatemala City, Guatemala.

The American School of Guatemala is an independent, non profit, non-denominational, college preparatory institution offering an academic program modeled after the education practices and methodologies of the United States. It is founded on the principles of coeducational, bi-cultural (Guatemala-United States), and bilingual (Spanish-English) teaching.

ASG is fully accredited in the U.S. by the New England Association of Colleges and Schools and is recognized by the Guatemalan Ministry of Education as a Laboratory School. As a member of the Del Valle Grupo Educativo, ASG is actively committed to the development of education in Guatemala./

== History ==
In 1945 a group of parents established the school. On June 10 of that year the first classes began with levels Kindergarten through grade 5. There were 34 students, and first campus was a private residence in Zone 9. The student body increased to 74 by the end of the first school year. By that time, 12 teachers worked at the school. A 1948 presidential decree gave permission for ASG to be an experimental/laboratory school. Later the school gained its first large campus in Zone 14. After a few years ASG moved to Zone 16 where it created it’s current campus. They had grades from K- 12 and offer scholarships to those who cannot pay.

== Accreditation and affiliations ==
ASG is a member of associations that sponsor activities and provide education services. These organizations are:

- Tri-Regional Association of American Schools in Mexico, Central America, Caribbean and Colombia
- Association of American Schools of Central America, AASCA
- Inter-Regional Center, IRC
- Association of Supervision and Curriculum Development, ASCD
- Association for the Advancement of International Education, AAIE
- New England Association of Schools and Colleges, NEASC

Finally, the school maintains relations with the Bucks County Organization for Intercultural Advancement, with headquarters in Princeton, New Jersey. Foreign teachers are contracted by this institution as exchange teachers.

== Notable alumni ==
- Luis von Ahn, computer scientist and professor at Carnegie Mellon University
- Gert Rosenthal, diplomat, permanent representative of Guatemala to the United Nations
- Oliverio Castañeda, civil rights activist, assassinated at the age of 23 during the Guatemalan Civil War
