= EteRNA =

2010 browser-based video game

Eterna
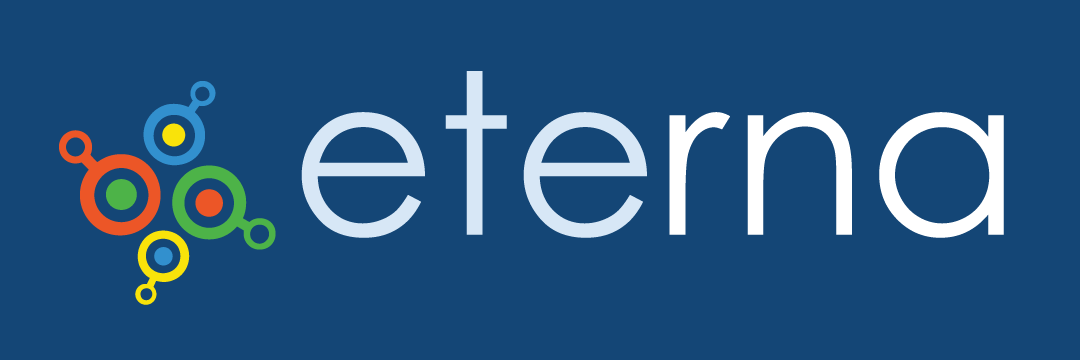
- Developers: Stanford University; Carnegie Mellon University
- Release: 2010
- Available in: English
- Type: Game with a purpose, Puzzle
- Website: eternagame.org

Eterna is a browser-based "game with a purpose", developed by scientists at Carnegie Mellon University and Stanford University, that engages users to solve puzzles related to the folding of RNA molecules. The project is supported by the Bill and Melinda Gates Foundation, Stanford University, and the National Institutes of Health. Prior funders include the National Science Foundation.

Similar to Foldit—created by some of the same researchers that developed Eterna—the puzzles take advantage of human problem-solving capabilities to solve puzzles that are computationally laborious for current computer models. The researchers hope to capitalize on "crowdsourcing" and the collective intelligence of Eterna players to answer fundamental questions about RNA folding mechanics. The top voted designs are synthesized in a Stanford biochemistry lab to evaluate the folding patterns of the RNA molecules to compare directly with the computer predictions, ultimately improving the computer models.

Ultimately, Eterna researchers hope to determine a "complete and repeatable set of rules" to allow the synthesis of RNAs that consistently fold in expected shapes. Eterna project leaders hope that determining these basic principles may facilitate the design of RNA-based nanomachines and switches. Eterna creators have been pleasantly surprised by the solutions of Eterna players, particularly those of non-researchers whose "creativity isn't constrained by what they think a correct answer should look like".

As of 2016, Eterna has about 250,000 registered players.

== Gameplay ==
Players are presented with a given target shape into which an RNA strand must fold. The player can change the sequence by placing any of the four RNA nucleotides (adenine, cytosine, guanosine and uracil) at various positions; this can alter the free energy of the system and dramatically affect the RNA strand's folding dynamics. In Eterna, different restrictions, such as those on the number of certain bases and the number of the three base pair types, as well as locked bases, are sometimes imposed. A molecule is occasionally also included, which binds with the RNA and has critical effects on the free energy of the system. In some more advanced puzzles, players may be presented with two or three different target shapes at the same time; the single sequence the player produces must fold in the respective shapes under different conditions (presence or absence of a binding molecule).

Eterna puzzles are roughly classified into three types: Challenges, Player Puzzles, and Cloud Lab. Challenges are the puzzles prepared by the game-makers to introduce players to the workings of Eterna as well as to provide series of pre-set puzzles for players to attempt. Player puzzles are generated by players, and Cloud Lab is where the active, proposed and archived laboratory projects are presented for players to review, vote or attempt.

New players are guided through an initial puzzle progression which introduces the basic concepts of RNA structure and folding. As players proceed through puzzles of increasing complexity, the different game interface elements are described. After completing the 30 puzzles and earning all five Eterna Essentials badges, players gain access to the Cloud Lab where they can participate in laboratory research. Once players have completed a sufficient number of RNA puzzles, they unlock the chance to generate puzzles for other players.

== Biomedical challenges ==
In 2016, Eterna launched its first biomedical challenge called OpenTB, an initiative to develop a new diagnostic device for tuberculosis. The project uses a gene expression "signature" discovered by Stanford researchers using public data, and aims to create an open source, paper-based diagnostic kit that can be easily deployed in clinics around the world. The development of the open source kit is a collaboration with MIT's Little Devices Lab. Players successfully designed RNAs to detect the gene signature by round 2 of the challenge, and as of February 2018 testing continues with real patient samples.

Following the success of OpenTB, Eterna launched OpenCRISPR in August 2017, which challenges players to design single guide RNAs (sgRNAs) used in CRISPR gene editing. The goal of the project is to create a new class of sgRNAs that can be modulated by another small molecule (such as theophylline), allowing gene editing in the body to be turned on or off as needed. At the conclusion of round 1 in November 2017, players had submitted over 90,000 RNA designs for synthesis, the largest set of submissions to date.

In response to the SARS-CoV-2 epidemic, Eterna joined the OpenVaccine collaboration to develop methods for stabilizing mRNA molecules that could be stored and shipped without the need for deep freezing. Players submitted 6000 designs for probing the stability of small RNA molecules at the nucleotide level, and used the results to design structured nanoluciferases that were tested for degradation in vitro and for protein expression in vivo. The OpenVaccine research resulted in novel methods and principles for designing stabilized mRNA therapeutics, including vaccines with potentially three times the current shelf life.

== Synthetic biology ==
In 2019, Eterna launched the ribosome engineering project OpenRibosome in collaboration with the Jewett Lab at Northwestern University to enhance the folding of modified Escherichia coli ribosomes on the iSAT cell-free ribosome construction platform. The protein production of twenty 16S and twenty 23S sequences designed by players are being evaluated in a series of four feedback-based iterations. The ribosomes are being reengineered as molecular machines capable of synthesizing unique polymers.

== Accomplishments ==
EteRNA maintains its own up-to-date list of publications. Human moves from the game are both used to directly achieve a scientific goal like designing a desired RNA shape and to improve the ability of machines to design RNAs.

=== Direct player contribution ===
- By August 2011, approximately 26,000 players had contributed RNA sequence designs and over 306 designs have been synthesized for in vitro testing.
- Eterna citizen scientists discovered a discrepancy in SHAPE and DMS chemical probing when reading strings of 7+ adenosine, and subsequently published their findings in Biochemistry in 2020. It is the first paper written exclusively by citizen scientists to be published in a peer-reviewed journal.
- In a 2023 paper, Eterna players design ribosomal RNA mutations for functional improvements (OpenRibosome Challenge). The players receive feedback from in vitro testing and in vivo (living E. coli) after each round to further tweak their designs.
- In a 2024 paper, Eterna players improved a research team's design of a minimized E. coli peptidyl transferase center (PTC). The improved version folds into a PTC-like structure without needing ribosomal proteins and interacts with small molecule analogs of tRNAs. The PTC is believed to be the most ancient part of the ribosome derived from the primordial RNA world and this work is a step closer to seeing the ancient version might have worked.

=== Algorithmic improvements based on human plays ===
- In January 2014, the results from Eterna have been published in the PNAS journal, with "Eterna participants" listed as co-authors in the paper. Human players compared the success rates of different designs in the test tube (in vitro) and came up with a number of rules. The rules were used to create an RNA design algorithm called EteRNABot with higher performance than existing ones.
- In 2016, 100 difficult EteRNA puzzles were compiled into the "Eterna100" in silico (ViennaRNA 1.8) secondary structure design benchmark set. All of these puzzles are known to be solvable because human players have done so, but the best algorithm of the time (out of 6 tested) could only complete 54 out of 100. The results of the challenges were published in the Journal of Molecular Biology in February 2016. The article includes notes on why certain designs were hard based on player experience. This was the first paper based on dominant writing contributions—and co-lead authorship—by non-expert citizen scientists recruited through a video game.
- In 2019, EteRNA published "EternaBrain", a deep learning-based model train on human moves. It was able to solve 61 puzzles out of the 100 in Eterna100.

== See also ==
- Citizen science
- Foldit
- Game with a purpose
- List of crowdsourcing projects
- Serious game
