= TLS fingerprinting =

Fingerprinting technique

TLS fingerprinting are a set of network-based fingerprinting techniques that are typically used as part of anti-bot infrastructure on the web.
