= John Langford (computer scientist) =

American computer scientist

- Born: January 2, 1975 (age 51)
- Education: California Institute of Technology; Carnegie Mellon University
- Known for: Isomap; CAPTCHA; Cover Trees; Contextual Bandits; Vowpal Wabbit learning reductions
- Scientific career
- Fields: Computer science, machine learning, learning theory
- Workplaces: Core Automation; Microsoft Research; Yahoo! Research; Toyota Technological Institute at Chicago; IBM Watson Research Center
- Thesis: (2002)

John Langford (born January 2, 1975) is a computer scientist working in machine learning and learning theory, a field that he says, "is shifting from an academic discipline to an industrial tool".

He is well known for work on the Isomap embedding algorithm, CAPTCHA challenges, Cover Trees for nearest neighbor search, Contextual Bandits (which he coined) for reinforcement learning applications, and learning reductions.

John is the author of the blog hunch.net and the principal developer of Vowpal Wabbit. He works at Microsoft Research New York, of which he was one of the founding members, and was previously affiliated with Yahoo! Research, Toyota Technological Institute at Chicago, and IBM's Watson Research Center. He studied Physics and Computer Science at the California Institute of Technology, earning a double bachelor's degree in 1997, and he received his Ph.D. in computer science from Carnegie Mellon University in 2002.

John was the program co-chair for the 2012 International Conference on Machine Learning (ICML), general chair for the 2016 ICML, and is the president of ICML from 2019 to 2021.
