= Jeremy Elson =

American computer scientist

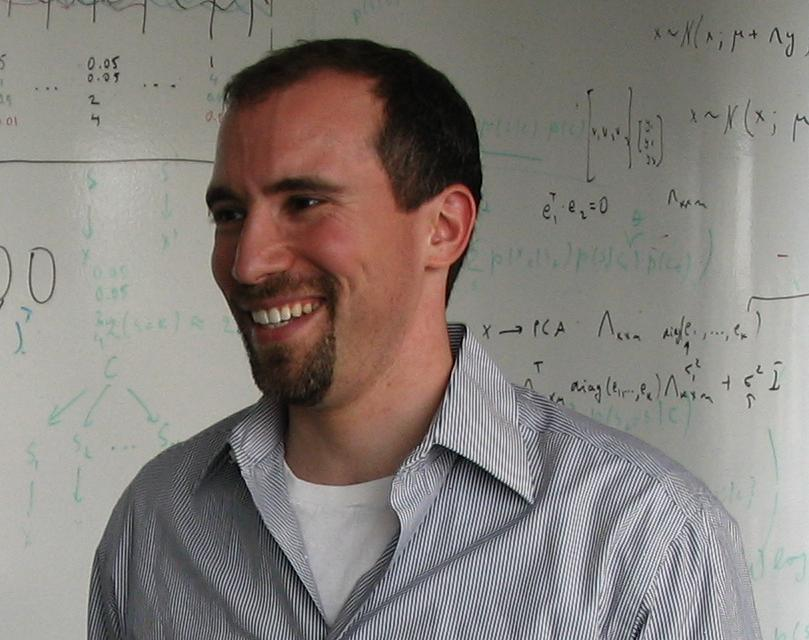
- Born: Jeremy Elson; January 1, 1974 (age 52)
- Citizenship: United States
- Education: Johns Hopkins University; BS, 1996; University of Southern California MS, 2000; UCLA, Ph.D., 2003
- Known for: Internet-centric distributed systems
- Scientific career
- Fields: Computer Science
- Doctoral advisor: Deborah Estrin

Jeremy Elson (born 1974) is a computer researcher specializing in wireless Sensor Networks. He is also the creator of the popular CircleMUD. Elson received his Ph.D. from UCLA in 2003. He previously worked at Microsoft Research in the Distributed Systems and Security group within Systems and Networking Research. Recent projects include MapCruncher and ASIRRA. In 2015, he started his career at Google. Jeremy is also known for his work on calculating whether a Powerball ticket can ever be profitable.
