= ReCAPTCHA =

CAPTCHA implementation owned by Google

reCAPTCHA Inc.
- Original authors: Luis von Ahn; Manuel Blum; David Abraham; Michael Crawford; Ben Maurer; Colin McMillen; Edison Tan
- Developer: Google
- Release: May 27, 2007; 19 years ago
- Type: Classic version: CAPTCHA; New version: Behavioral analysis
- Website: cloud.google.com/security/products/recaptcha

reCAPTCHA Inc. is a corporation that produces CAPTCHA systems, which help websites distinguish between human users and automated bots. It is owned by Google, its parent company. The original version of reCAPTCHA asked users to decipher hard-to-read text or match images. Version 2 only showed these challenges when its checks of cookies and canvas rendering suggested that a bot was loading the page. Version 3 does not interrupt users at all. It runs in the background when users load pages or click buttons.

The first version of the service was also a mass collaboration project to help digitize books, especially pages that were too hard for computers to read. Each test showed two words from a scanned page. The first word was already known by the system and was used to check the validity of the user. The second was a word the computer could not properly read, and users' answers contributed to a crowdsource which helped the computer to read the word. reCAPTCHA was originally developed by Luis von Ahn, David Abraham, Manuel Blum, Michael Crawford, Ben Maurer, Colin McMillen, and Edison Tan at Carnegie Mellon University. It was acquired by Google in September 2009. The system helped to digitize the archives of The New York Times, and was subsequently used by Google Books for similar purposes.

By 2010, the system was reported as displaying over 100 million CAPTCHAs every day on sites such as Facebook, Ticketmaster, Twitter, 4chan, CNN.com, StumbleUpon, Craigslist, and the U.S. National Telecommunications and Information Administration's digital TV converter box program website (as part of the US DTV transition).

In 2014, Google moved the service away from its original idea. The new focus was to ask users to do as little as possible, and to show a challenge (such as picking out certain images from a grid) only when behavioral analysis suggests the user may be a bot.

In October 2023, users found that they could trick Microsoft's Bing Chat, which is based on GPT-4, into solving CAPTCHAs. The service has been criticized for lack of security and accessibility while collecting user data, with a 2023 study estimating the collective cost of human time spent solving CAPTCHAs as $6.1 billion in wages.

== Origin ==
Distributed Proofreaders was the first project to use volunteers to read scanned text that optical character recognition (OCR) programs could not read. It works with Project Gutenberg to digitize public domain books, but its methods are very different from reCAPTCHA's.

The idea for reCAPTCHA came from the Guatemalan computer scientist Luis von Ahn, whose work was helped by a MacArthur Fellowship. Von Ahn had worked on early CAPTCHAs, and he realized that "he had unwittingly created a system that was frittering away, in ten-second increments, millions of hours of a most precious resource: human brain cycles".

== Operation ==
=== reCAPTCHA v1 (human-assisted OCR) ===
Image identification CAPTCHA, which requires users to select the appropriate images to verify they are human

Scanned text was first read by two different OCR programs. Any word that the two programs read differently, or that was not in an English dictionary, was marked as "suspicious" and turned into a CAPTCHA. The suspicious word was shown on its own, often next to a control word that was already known. If the user typed the control word correctly, their answer for the suspicious word was taken as probably correct. This meant that if enough users typed the control word correctly but got the other word wrong, the wrong word could end up in the digitized text. Each OCR program's reading counted as half a point, and each human answer counted as one point. Once a reading reached 2.5 points, it was accepted. Words that users kept reading the same way were later reused as control words. If the first three human answers matched each other but not either OCR reading, they were taken as correct, and the word became a control word. If six users rejected a word before any reading was accepted, the word was thrown out as unreadable.

The original reCAPTCHA showed the suspicious words on their own, rather than with the words around them in the source text (for example, as part of a five-word phrase). Even so, the control word could still mislead users about the second word. For example, "metal fife" might be typed as "metal file", because a metal file is a more familiar phrase than the musical instrument, a "fife".

In 2012, reCAPTCHA began using photographs taken from the Google Street View project, in addition to scanned words. It asks the user to identify images of crosswalks, street lights, and other objects. Some people have suggested that this data is used to train self-driving cars at Waymo, a Google sister company. In 2021, a Google spokesperson denied this and said the data was only used to improve Google Maps.

reCAPTCHA v1 was declared end-of-life and shut down on March 31, 2018.

=== reCAPTCHA v2 (checkbox) ===
The NoCAPTCHA reCAPTCHA

In 2013, reCAPTCHA began implementing behavioral analysis of the browser's interactions to predict whether the user was a human or a bot. The following year, Google began to deploy a new reCAPTCHA API, featuring the "no CAPTCHA reCAPTCHA"—where users who seem low-risk only need to tick a single checkbox to show they are human. If the system is unsure about a user, it still shows a CAPTCHA. Google also added a new kind of challenge that is easier to do on mobile phones, where the user picks the images in a grid that match a prompt.

=== reCAPTCHA v3 and reCAPTCHA Enterprise (invisible) ===
In 2017, Google introduced a new "invisible" reCAPTCHA, where the checks happen in the background and low-risk users see no challenge at all. According to former Google "click fraud czar" Shuman Ghosemajumder, this capability "creates a new sort of challenge that very advanced bots can still get around, but introduces a lot less friction to the legitimate human."

== Implementation ==
reCAPTCHA tests are loaded from Google's servers, not from the website using them. This is done through a JavaScript API. After the user submits a form, the website's server checks the answer with reCAPTCHA. Google provides libraries for several programming languages to make this easier. reCAPTCHA was first offered to websites for free, but Google now charges sites that make more than a million reCAPTCHA queries a month. The software is not open-source.

There are also plugins for web platforms such as ASP.NET, Ruby, and PHP.

== Security ==
An example of how reCAPTCHA challenges were presented in 2010, containing the words "and chisels"

The main purpose of a CAPTCHA system is to block spambots while allowing human users. On December 14, 2009, Jonathan Wilkins released a paper describing weaknesses in reCAPTCHA that allowed bots to achieve a solve rate of 18%.

On August 1, 2010, Chad Houck gave a talk at the DEF CON 18 hacking conference about a way to undo the distortion in reCAPTCHA images. His method let a computer program give a correct answer 10% of the time. Google changed reCAPTCHA on July 21, 2010, shortly before his talk. Houck then adapted his method to the new version, which he called "easier", and it gave a correct answer 31.8% of the time. Houck also mentioned security defenses in the system, including a high-security lockout if an invalid response is given 32 times in a row.

On May 26, 2012, Adam, C-P, and Jeffball of DC949 gave a presentation at the LayerOne hacker conference detailing how they were able to achieve an automated solution with an accuracy rate of 99.1%. They used machine learning to solve the audio version of reCAPTCHA, which is meant for people who are blind or have low vision. Google released a new version of reCAPTCHA just hours before their talk, making major changes to both the audio and visual versions of their service. The new audio challenges were 30 seconds long instead of 8, and much harder to understand for both humans and bots. After this update and the next one, DC949 released two new versions of their tool, called Stiltwalker. These solved reCAPTCHA 60.95% and 59.4% of the time. After each successive break, Google updated reCAPTCHA within a few days. According to DC949, Google often went back to features that had already been broken.

On June 27, 2012, Claudia Cruz-Pérez and four other researchers published a paper on a system that solved reCAPTCHA images with 82% accuracy. The authors did not say whether it could solve newer reCAPTCHA images, but they described it as an intelligent OCR that could handle at least some changes to the images.

In an August 2012 talk at BSides Las Vegas, DC949 called the newest version "unfathomably impossible for humans", saying they could not solve it either.

== Criticism ==
The first version of reCAPTCHA was criticized for using people's unpaid work to transcribe text. In 2015, a Massachusetts woman sued Google over this.

A 13-month study published in 2023, "Dazed & Confused: A Large-Scale Real-World User Study of reCAPTCHAv2," argued that reCAPTCHA gives little protection against bots and works mainly as a way to track users. The authors estimated that it had cost people about 819 million hours of unpaid time.

=== Privacy ===
The current version has been criticized for relying on tracking cookies and for tying websites to Google's services (vendor lock-in). Google advises site owners to add reCAPTCHA code to every page, so it can study how users behave and decide how hard their challenge should be. Fast Company reported that the system favors users who are signed in to a Google account, and treats people using VPNs or anonymizing proxies as higher risk.

When Google announced reCAPTCHA v3, some raised privacy concerns because it lets Google track users on websites outside Google.

In April 2020, Cloudflare switched from reCAPTCHA to hCaptcha, made by Intuition Machines. Cloudflare gave three reasons: worries that Google might use reCAPTCHA data for targeted advertising, Google services being blocked at times in some countries such as China, and the cost after Google started charging for reCAPTCHA. In response, Google told PC Magazine that the data from reCAPTCHA is never used for personalized advertising purposes.

=== Accessibility ===
Google's help center says that reCAPTCHA does not support deafblind users, which can lock them out of websites that use it. The web accessibility organization WebAIM reported in May 2012, "Over 90% of respondents [screen reader users] find CAPTCHA very or somewhat difficult". Version 3 could make reCAPTCHA more accessible, because it is invisible and users do not have to do anything. The checks happen in the background instead. However, many websites still fall back to reCAPTCHA v2's image or audio challenges. The Bureau of Internet Accessibility has said that this mix causes problems for users with disabilities.

=== Interface ===
In one type of challenge, each image fades out when clicked and a new image fades in to replace it. Some users have complained that this fading is very slow.

=== Requiring Google Play Services ===
Some reports say that reCAPTCHA has started to depend on Google Play Services on Android, which stops it from working on phones that have had Google's software removed (DeGoogled phones).

== Derivative projects ==
reCAPTCHA also created Mailhide, a tool that protected email addresses on web pages from being collected by spammers. By default, the email address was converted into a format that did not allow a crawler to see the full email address; for example, "mailme@example.com" would have been converted to "mai...@example.com". The visitor would then click on the "..." and solve the CAPTCHA to obtain the full email address. Site owners could also change the code so that the whole address was hidden. Mailhide was discontinued in 2018 because it relied on reCAPTCHA v1.
