= Microwork =

Series of small tasks which together comprise a large unified project

Microwork is a series of many small tasks which together comprise a large, unified project completed by many people over the Internet. Microwork is considered the smallest unit of work in a virtual assembly line. It is most often used to describe tasks for which no efficient algorithm has been devised and require human intelligence to complete reliably. The term was developed in 2008 by Leila Chirayath Janah of Samasource.

== Microtasking ==
Microtasking is the process of splitting a large job into small tasks that can be distributed, over the Internet, to many people. Since the inception of microwork, many online services have been developed that specialize in different types of microtasking. Most of them rely on a large, voluntary workforce composed of Internet users from around the world.

Typical tasks offered are repetitive but not so simple that they can be automated. Good candidates for microtasks have the following characteristics:

- They are large volume tasks
- They can be broken down into tasks that are done independently
- They require human judgement

It may also be known as ubiquitous human computing or human-based computation when focused on computational tasks that are too complex for distributed computing.

Microtasks are distinguished from macrotasks, which typically can be done independently. They require a fixed amount of time and they require a specialized skill.

The wage paid can range from a few cents per task to hundreds of dollars per project.

== Examples ==
Amazon Mechanical Turk and Toloka are examples of microwork platforms that allow workers to choose and perform simple tasks online, reporting directly through the platform to receive payments in exchange. A task can be as complex as algorithm writing or as simple as labelling photos or videos, describing products, or transcribing scanned documents. Employers submit tasks and set their own payments, which are often pennies for each task.

Amazon Mechanical Turk, a crowdsourcing project initiated by Amazon, soon became a service to contract individuals to finish tasks that computers are unable to accomplish. The founder of Amazon Jeff Bezos told The New York Times in 2007: “Normally, a human makes a request of a computer, and the computer does the computation of the task. But artificial artificial intelligences like Mechanical Turk invert all that. The computer has a task that is easy for a human but extraordinarily hard for the computer. So instead of calling a computer service to perform the function, it calls a human.”

LiveOps uses a distributed network of people to run a "Cloud Call Center", which is a virtual call center. Contracted workers can answer calls and provide other call center facilities without the need for the physical building or equipment of a traditional call center. The Red Cross used this system successfully during Hurricane Katrina in 2005, to process 17,000+ calls without having to open or hire staff for a call center.

InnoCentive allows businesses to post problems and offer payment for answers. These questions are often far less simple than tasks posted on services like Mechanical Turk, and the payments are accordingly higher. For example: "Think you can find a way to prevent orange juice stored in see-through bottles from turning brown? There may be $20,000 in it for you."

Galaxy Zoo is a scientific effort to use online crowdsourcing to classify a very large number of galaxies from astronomical images.

In 2010, the company Internet Eyes launched a service where in return for a potential reward, home viewers would watch live CCTV streams and alert shop owners of potential theft in progress.

== Uses ==
Most uses of microtasking services involve processing data, especially online. These include driving traffic to websites, gathering data like email addresses, and labelling or tagging data online. They are also used to accurately translate or transcribe audio clips and pictures, since these are activities that are better suited to humans than computers. These are used both for practical data conversion purposes, but also to improve upon and test the fidelity of machine learning algorithms. Identification of pictures by humans has been used to help in missing persons searches, though to little effect.

These services can also be used for social study outreach, providing a way to offer monetary incentives.

Companies can also outsource projects to specialists on whom they otherwise would have expended more resources hiring and screening. This method of pay per task is attractive to employers; therefore, companies like Microsoft, AT&T, Yahoo! are currently crowdsourcing some of their work through CrowdFlower, a company that specializes in allocating jobs for foreign and local crowd workers. CrowdFlower alone has completed 450 million completed human intelligence tasks between 2007 and 2012. CrowdFlower operates differently than Amazon Mechanical Turk. Jobs are taken in by the company; then in turn they are allocated to the right workers through a range of channels. They implemented a system called Virtual Play, which allows the users to play free games that would in turn accomplish useful tasks for the company.

== Demographics ==
In 2011 an estimated $375 million was contributed by digital crowdsourced labour.

As of November 2009, India and the United States together make up roughly 92% of the workers on Amazon Mechanical Turk with the U.S. making up 56% of these. However, the percentage of Indian Turkers quadrupled in only one year from 2008 to 2009. As of 2009, the Indian Turkers are much younger and more educated than their American counterparts, with the average age of Indian workers being 26 and American workers being 35. In addition, 45% of the digital workforce in India have bachelor's degrees and 21% have master's degrees; in contrast only 38% of American Turkers have a bachelor's degree and 17% with a master's degree. Nonetheless, a majority of the digital workforce is educated young adults. The major difference between the American and Indian workforce lies in the gender: 63% of Indian Turkers are male compared to the 37% that makes up American Turkers.

== Reasons for using microwork services ==
Microtasking services as they are implemented now allow their workers to work from home. Workers complete tasks on a voluntary basis; other than with time-sensitive jobs like call centers, they choose which jobs to complete and when they complete them.

Workers can work from anywhere in the world and receive payment directly over the Internet. Because workers can reside anywhere in the world, microwork can provide job opportunities with large Fortune 500 companies and many smaller companies for people living in poverty who would otherwise not be able to make a living wage. Through services like Samasource work and wealth are distributed from companies in developed countries to a large volume of families in poverty, especially women and youth who would otherwise not be able to generate income. (Some services like Amazon Mechanical Turk, restrict the countries workers can connect from.)

For employers, microtasking services provide a platform to quickly get a project online and start receiving results from many workers at the same time. The services offer large workforces which complete tasks concurrently, so large volumes of small tasks can be completed quickly. Furthermore, since each task is discretely contained and tasks are usually simple in nature, each individual worker does not have to be fully trained or have complete knowledge of the project to contribute work. Under United States tax law, workers are treated as independent contractors, which means employers do not have to withhold taxes, and they only need to file a form 1099-MISC with the Internal Revenue Service if a given worker earns more than $600 per year. Workers are responsible for paying income taxes, including self-employment tax that would otherwise be paid by their employer.

== Treatment of workers ==
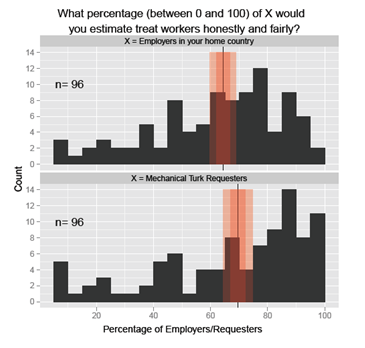
A small survey of Amazon Mechanical Turk workers found they think Mechanical Turk employers treat workers about as fairly as offline employers in their home country.

Microtasking services have been criticized for not providing healthcare and retirement benefits, sick pay, and minimum wage, because they pay by the piece and treat workers as independent contractors rather than employees. They can also avoid laws on child labor and labor rights. Additionally, workers may have little idea of what their work is used for. The result may be that workers end up contributing to a project which has some negative impact or which they are morally opposed to.

Some services, especially Amazon Mechanical Turk and other services that pay pennies on the task, have been called "digital sweatshops" by analogy with sweatshops in the manufacturing industry that exploit workers and maintain poor conditions. Wages vary considerably depending on the speed of the worker and the per-piece price being offered. Workers choose what tasks they complete based on the task, price, and their experience with the employer. Employers can bid higher for faster completion or for higher-quality workers. On average, unskilled Turkers earn less than $2.00 an hour. This is below minimum wage in the United States; however, for India, this is well above the minimum for most cities (India has more than 1200 minimum wages).

Because global services outsource work to underdeveloped or developing regions, competitive pricing and task completion could result in lower wages. Those low wages brought down by global competition are felt by microworkers in developed countries like the UK, where it's estimated that nearly two in three microworkers are paid less than £4 an hour. The possibility also exists for true brick and mortar sweatshops to exploit microtasking services by enlisting those that are too poor to afford a computer of their own and aggregating their work and wages. There is also the possibility that the requesters may tell the worker that they reject the work but cheat the worker by using it anyway to avoid paying for it. However, while the dispersed geography of microwork can be used to keep wages low, the very networks that fragment the labour process can also be used by workers for organising and resistance.

The San Francisco-based company CrowdFlower has facilitated outsourcing digital tasks to countries with poverty to stimulate their local economies. The crowdsourcing company has a partnership with Samasource, a non-profit organization that brings computer based work to developing countries, they have currently outsourced millions of repetitive microwork to the Kenyan refugee camps. These workers make $2 an hour; to the locals this is above average for refugees. When asked if this is exploitation, Lukas Biewald of CrowdFlower argues that the "digital sweatshop" is a much better job for people from the developing world as opposed to working in a manufacturing sweatshop. He states that the treatment received by the workers are far superior and should not be categorized as a sweatshop, "The great thing about digital work is it's really hard to make a sweatshop out of digital work. It's really hard to force someone to do work, you can't beat someone up through a computer screen."

== See also ==
- InnoCentive (company)
- Human-based computation
- Citizen science
- Micro job
- Crowdsourcing
- CrowdFlower (company)
- For the Win — novel involving digital labour conflicts
- List of crowdsourcing projects
- Digital labor
- Wages for housework
- Online volunteering
