= Alice Tully Hall =

Concert hall at Lincoln Center in New York City

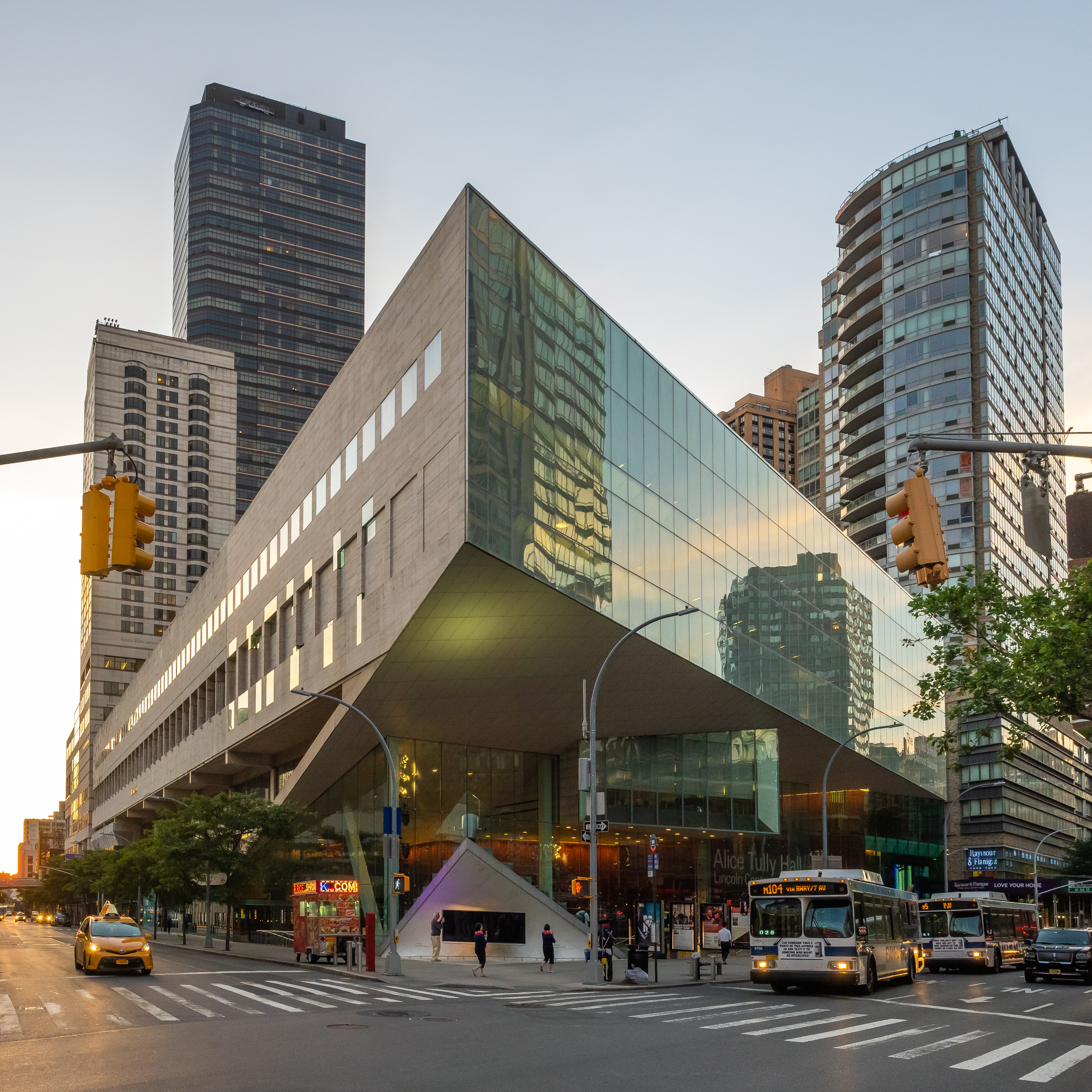
- Alice Tully Hall in the Juilliard School building
- Interactive map of Alice Tully Hall
- Address: 1941 Broadway
- Location: New York City, New York, United States
- Coordinates: 40°46′24″N 73°58′56″W
- Owner: Lincoln Center for the Performing Arts
- Capacity: 1,086
- Type: Concert hall
- Public transit: Subway: (all times) (late nights) at 66th Street–Lincoln Center; NYC Bus: M5, M7, M11, M20, M66, M104

Construction
- Opened: September 11, 1969

Tenants
- New York Film Festival; Chamber Music Society of Lincoln Center

Website
- www.lincolncenter.org/venue/alice-tully-hall

Alice Tully Hall is a concert hall at the Lincoln Center for the Performing Arts on the Upper West Side of Manhattan in New York City. The hall is named for Alice Tully, a New York performer and philanthropist whose donations assisted in the construction of the hall. Tully Hall is located within the Irene Diamond Building, a Brutalist structure designed by architect Pietro Belluschi. It was completed and subsequently opened in 1969. Since its opening, it has hosted numerous performances and events, including the New York Film Festival. Tully Hall seats 1,086 patrons. It is the home of the Chamber Music Society of Lincoln Center.

As part of the Lincoln Center 65th Street Development Project, the Juilliard School and Tully Hall underwent a major renovation and expansion by architects Diller Scofidio + Renfro and FXFOWLE, which were completed in 2009. The building utilizes new interior materials, technologies, and updated equipment for concerts, film, theater, and dance. The expansion of the Irene Diamond Duilding features a three-story all-glass lobby and sunken plaza beneath a new, cantilevered extension, “projecting a newly visible public identity to Broadway.”

== Site ==
Buildings of Lincoln Center
Buildings and structures in Lincoln Center:
1 Samuel B. and David Rose Building (includes Walter Reade Theater)
2 Juilliard School
3 Alice Tully Hall
4 Vivian Beaumont Theater (includes Mitzi E. Newhouse Theater and Claire Tow Theater)
5 Elinor Bunin Monroe Film Center
6 David Geffen Hall
7 New York Public Library for the Performing Arts (includes Bruno Walter Auditorium)
8 Metropolitan Opera House
9 Josie Robertson Plaza with Revson Fountain
10 Damrosch Park
11 David H. Koch Theater
12 David Rubenstein Atrium
13 Jazz at Lincoln Center

The Irene Diamond Building sits along the west side of Broadway, between 65th and 66th Streets (across the street from David Geffen Hall and the Lincoln Center parking garage). Prior to its expansion, it maintained a rectangular footprint of approximately 200 x 350 feet (110 m). Also, prior to the re-development project, the building's primary means of connection to the main Lincoln Center complex was a large pedestrian footbridge (named the Paul Milstein Plaza) that crossed over and covered a large portion of West 65th Street. Despite the original building's shape, its site was rhomboidal in shape, due to the diagonal progression of Broadway through the orthogonal grid of Manhattan. Rejecting Broadway's diagonal progression, the architects oriented Juilliard to the grid, using the remaining triangular section as a small plaza.

Though not located on the complex's superblock between West 62nd and 65th Streets, the architects identified the original Juilliard building with Lincoln Center through the footbridge connection and use of cladding. Gordon Bunshaft originally envisioned the bridge to better integrate Juilliard with the main Lincoln Center campus and hide street traffic. Little to no consideration was given to the effects of such a wide bridge on the street below.

As Juilliard's main public theater, Alice Tully Hall was not given a prominent entrance, despite the fact that it was housed in the only Lincoln Center building on a site directly facing Broadway. The entrance was instead tucked under the second-story outdoor terrace/footbridge and the monumental exterior staircase that led up to it from the plaza. This feature along with the rejection of the diagonal and the setting back of the building from Broadway follow a similar logic of detachment from the city street that the main Lincoln Center campus embodied. This original entrance to Tully Hall became fully visible only once the terrace, staircase, and footbridge was removed in 2006.

== History ==
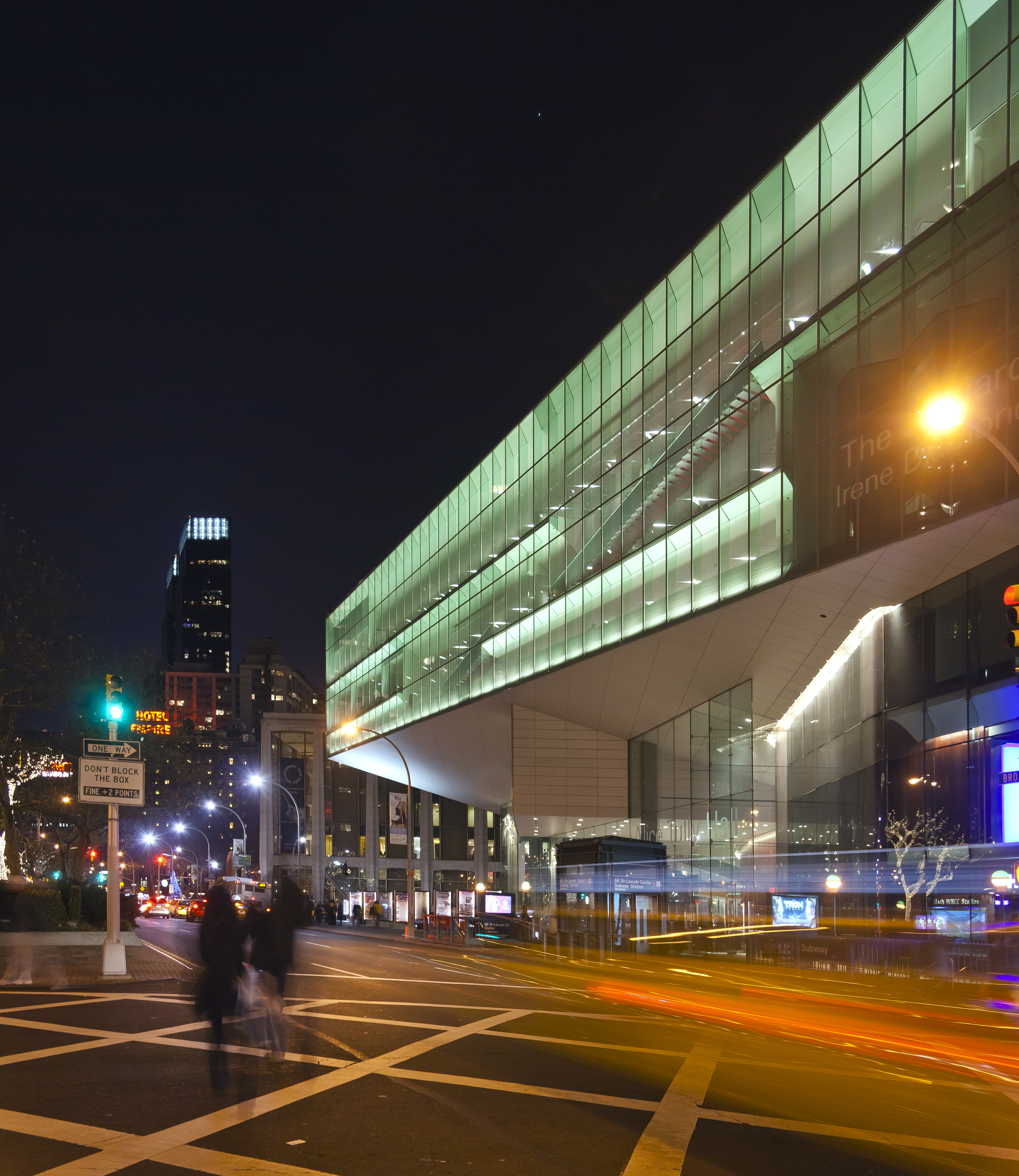
Alice Tully Hall, seen from Broadway

=== Context and construction ===
Before the construction of Philharmonic Hall (later named Avery Fisher Hall, now renamed David Geffen Hall), now David Geffen Hall, most of the chamber music performances in New York City were held at The Town Hall on West 43rd Street, which had been built in 1921. The founders of Lincoln Center wished to have a chamber music hall in the complex, as there was still a need for a dedicated space. Before construction on Lincoln Center began, the architects considered placing a chamber music hall in the basement of Philharmonic Hall. However, as the Juilliard School needed a concert hall that was equal in size to a chamber music hall, Lincoln Center chose to build one in the Juilliard building. Construction on the Juilliard building began in 1965 on a site one block north of the original Lincoln Center complex and part of the parcel designated for improvement through urban renewal. The cost of the chamber music hall was approximately $4.2 million, all of which was covered by donations from Alice Tully, a New York chamber music patron and former singer.

Alice Tully Hall was designed as part of the Juilliard School building by Pietro Belluschi, who became involved with the Lincoln Center project in October 1956, when he participated in a two-week conference devoted to discussing the planning of the center. The president of the Juilliard School consulted with Belluschi on which architect to choose for the project, and though Belluschi had submitted a list of architects to be considered, he was ultimately chosen for the role. He collaborated with Eduardo Catalano and Helge Westermann. Westermann had established an office in New York, which Belluschi and Catalano used as a local liaison for the project. Over twelve years, the architectural team had developed approximately 70 sets of preliminary drawings.

The project had been put on hold, pending decisions on the final site and budget, but went forward in 1963. Tired of battling budget restrictions and changing program requirements, Belluschi and Catalano had difficulty generating new plans when the project restarted. Several of their previously proposed plans were turned over to Robert Burns, Frederick Taylor, and Frederick Preis, three employees at Catalano's office. Burns’ plan was based heavily off Catalano's MIT Student Center (completed in 1965). Catalano was regularly available for guidance and criticism on the project, whereas Belluschi would only stop in occasionally to review the work of Catalano's office. Belluschi played a more public role, communicating with Juilliard and with donors. He also was highly involved in designing spaces like the performance hall lobbies and foyers.

Acoustician Heinrich Keilholz designed the hall's acoustics. Alice Tully played an influential role in the design of the hall. In a 1992 interview, Patrick McGinnis, former director of operations of Alice Tully Hall, described Tully as "very, very particular and meticulous about her choices of colors and what she wanted in the hall that would bear her name." Tully also insisted on there creating ample space between the rows of seats, allowing concertgoers of all heights to be comfortable.

=== Opening, use and renovation ===
Tully Hall opened on September 11, 1969. Its opening night showcased the first concert of the Chamber Music Society of Lincoln Center. The New York Times praised the “restrained, elegant interior” of basswood, deep lavender carpeting, and raspberry seats,” and Mildred Schmertz of Architectural Record stated that Alice Tully Hall and the other auditoriums in the Juilliard School building “prove that it is possible to create elegant halls in contemporary terms without resorting to skimpy evocations of the gilt, plaster, and crystal décor of the great halls of the past.” Since its opening, Tully Hall has served as a venue for numerous events, including Mostly Mozart, Great Performers, the New York Film Festivals, and Jazz at Lincoln Center. In 1975, a cathedral-sized, 4,192-pipe organ was installed.

Diller Scofidio + Renfro were chosen in 2003 as the design architects to redevelop Lincoln Center's 65th Street corridor, beating out Norman Foster, Richard Meier, and Santiago Calatrava in a 2002 design competition. The plan called for the adjacent block of 65th Street to be renovated with a more pedestrian-friendly environment. In April 2004, Lincoln Center unveiled the designs by Diller Scofidio + Renfro and FXFOWLE for the first phase of its redevelopment project, which included the expansion of the Juilliard building and the redesign of Alice Tully Hall. The plan received final approval and construction began in March 2006. The plan was praised by many architecture critics, but it also received criticism from preservationists, such as advocacy group Docomomo International, which wished to see the original Belluschi building remain intact. The New York City Landmarks Preservation Commission declined in 2005 to designate Alice Tully Hall as a city landmark. The majority of the controversy has been focused on changes being made to other parts of Lincoln Center, in phase two of the redevelopment project.

By June 2006, Lincoln Center, Inc. had raised $339 million, 75% of the $459 million it was responsible for raising for the project. The total goal for the project was $650 million, and the remainder of the money was provided by the federal government and the governments of New York City and State. Lincoln Center also received 20 gifts of $5 million or more, nine of which were at $10 million and above. The donors included individuals, corporations, and foundations, as well as banks Morgan Stanley, Credit Suisse, and Bank of New York Mellon. Work on Alice Tully Hall commenced in April 2007.

Tully Hall reopened in February 2009 with a two-week celebration. The Juilliard expansion and renovation was projected to cost around $100 million, but it was reported to have cost as much as $360 million; no official numbers have been released. The entire West 65th Street project was projected to cost $325 million. Charles Renfro, a partner at Diller Scofidio + Renfro, stated that the sum was probably twice as high as it would have cost to tear down Belluschi's building and build anew.

== Architecture ==
=== Exterior ===
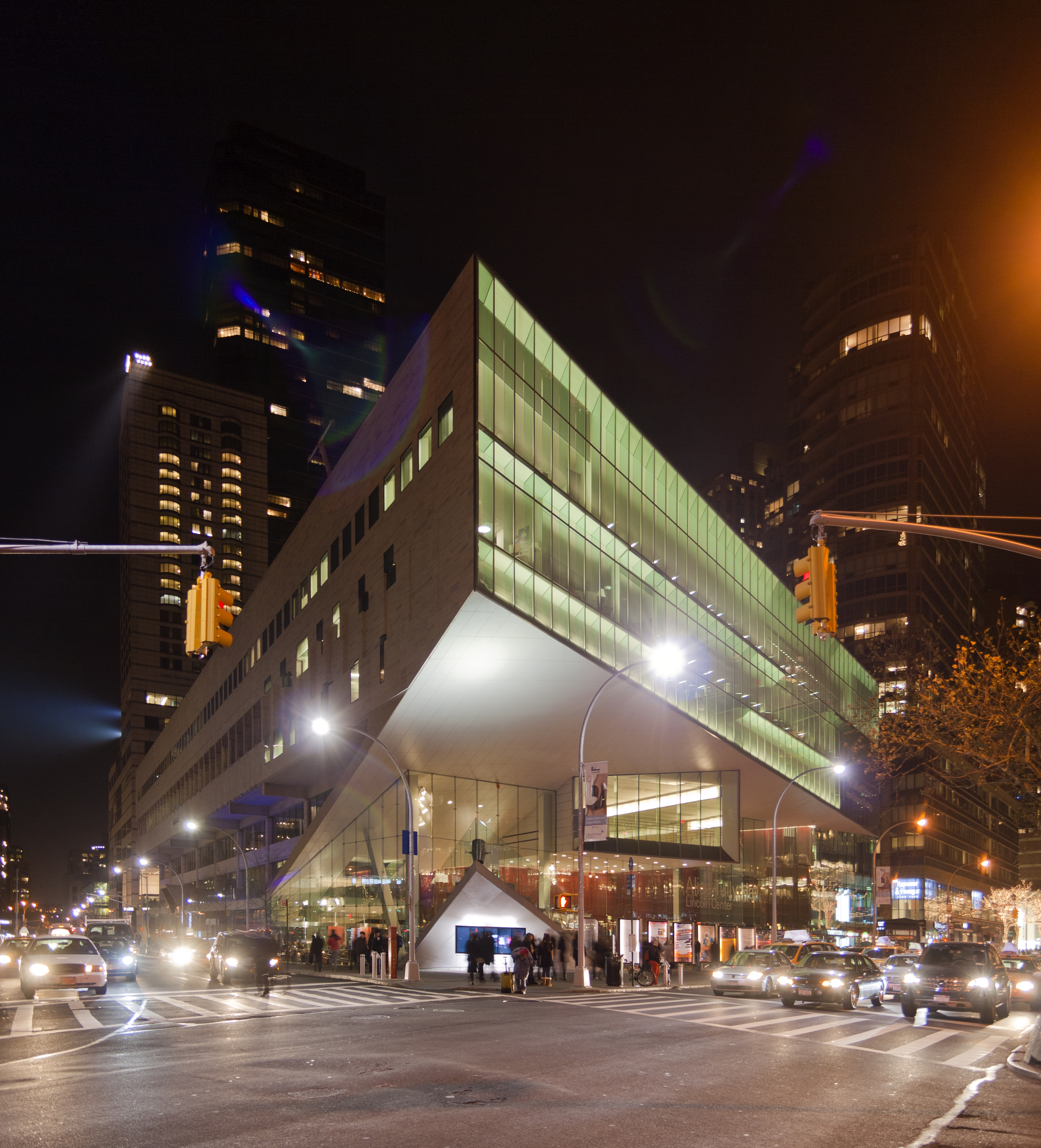
Alice Tully Hall and the Juilliard School from the intersection of Broadway and 65th Street

In keeping with the Brutalist style, Juilliard features rigorous geometries and highly cantilevered forms. Initial studies by Pietro Belluschi and Eduardo Catalano related more toward the white classical temple image adopted for the other Lincoln Center buildings. As the studies progressed and the site moved to the lot between West 65th and 66th Streets, there was an administrative shift at the Juilliard School. The new president expanded the curriculum and altered the program of the school. In response to these changes in both site and program, the design, ultimately constructed, was the Robert Burns scheme fashioned off the MIT Student Center.

The scheme is based on the placement of main performance spaces on either side of a central vertical circulation core. At a cost of nearly $30 million in 1969, the 490,000-square-foot (46,000 m^{2}) building contained: 10 floors (4 above ground, 4 below), 3 Juilliard theaters, the public Alice Tully Hall, 15 large dance, opera, and drama studios, 3 organ studios, 84 practice rooms, 27 classrooms and ensemble studios, 30 private instruction studios, numerous orchestra and choral rehearsal rooms, scenery and costume studios and workshops, a library, lounge, snack bar, and administration offices. The theaters and working floors are tied together by a West 65th Street vestibule-lobby that rises several stories, allowing one to orient oneself upon entering the building. The arrangement and packing of a campus’ worth of spaces into a single building greatly impressed architectural critics, but was not as well received by the students of Juilliard, who were confused by the building's circulation.

The Juilliard building, set on a regular structural grid, was designed in steel and concrete with a travertine veneer (for which the material was donated by the Italian government). However, the public entrance to Alice Tully Hall under the second-story terrace and exterior staircase was difficult to find. The removal of the West 65th Street footbridge, in 2006, unveiled this entrance, but it did not attain full prominence until the renovation and expansion of Tully Hall and Juilliard.

=== Interior ===
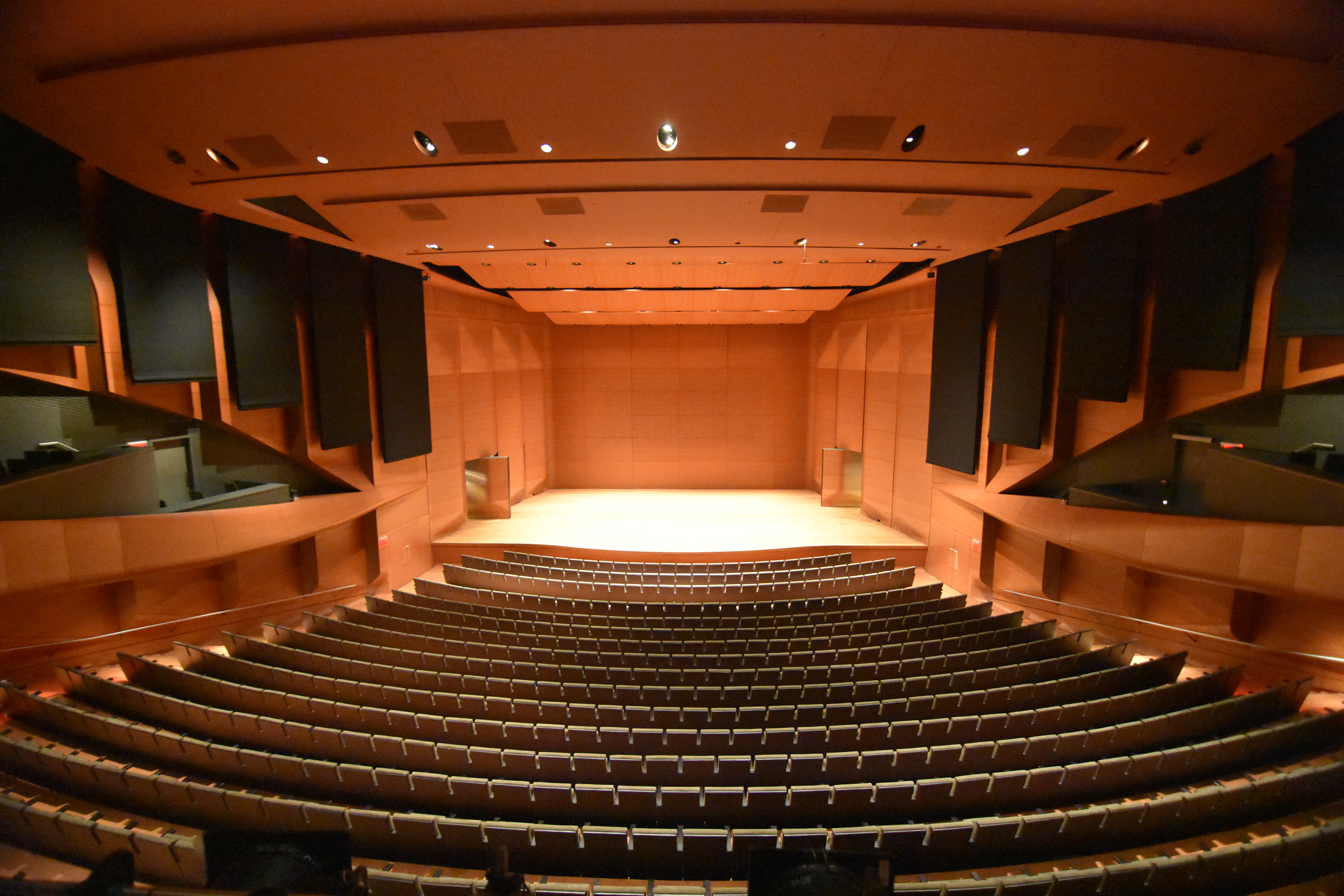
Starr Theater in 2018

Most of the building's interior was extremely simple, with walls often left as bare concrete aggregate with wall-to-wall carpeting on the floors in several areas. The theaters, on the other hand, were far more finely detailed. Tully Hall was (in accordance with the desires of Alice Tully herself) designed with wood batten with dampening behind, and lavender carpet “casting 1930s-ish mauve lights in the foyer.” Though the theater's lobby was large, it was depressed several feet below grade. The theater was designed mainly for recitals and chamber music performances, but because the first three rows of seats could be replaced by an expanded stage, it could also accommodate small orchestras. Tully Hall is located within 22 feet (6.7 m) of the subway tunnel under Broadway, and this required the insertion of a one-inch-thick, cork-lined asbestos pad between the theater's foundation and bedrock, as well as the isolation of the theater's walls from structural columns. Tully Hall's acoustics were praised as being among the best of any performance hall in Lincoln Center, thanks to the work of acoustician Heinrich Keilholz (who consulted on the acoustics of the entire building as well).

After its renovation, Tully Hall's lobby doubled in size from 5,157 to 9,468 square feet (479.1 to 879.6 m^{2}), with a 3,600-square-foot (330 m^{2}) patron's salon added on the mezzanine level. A public café named at65 is visible in the lobby along Broadway, backed by blood-red walls of tongue-and-groove muirapiranga wood, which now wrap the new performance hall (renamed the Starr Theater). The lobby's floors are made of Portuguese ataija azul limestone. The east and south elevations are sheathed with a mullionless one-way-cable wall system, allowing for maximum transparency.

Narrow passageways lead to the side entrances of the concert hall. The passageway walls are lined with dark gray felt and the floors are covered with gray industrial carpeting. Elisabeth Diller calls this the “sensory deprivation space”, as it is meant to heighten the drama of coming into the auditorium. The theater's new skin consists almost entirely of translucent eco-friendly resin and African moabi wood panels that were developed with 3form (and are between 1 and 1.5 inches thick). The panels form gill-like acoustic baffles along the side walls or become pivoting pyramid shapes that bounce sound. Sections of the balcony and side walls give emit a soft pinkish light as LEDs hidden behind them glow through the opaque moabi veneer. Aesthetics, acoustics, and lighting were all incorporated into these panels to remove visual clutter and create a more inviting space. The stage can now be configured in three different ways, as the front rows are capable of sliding down and underneath it.

==== Renovation ====
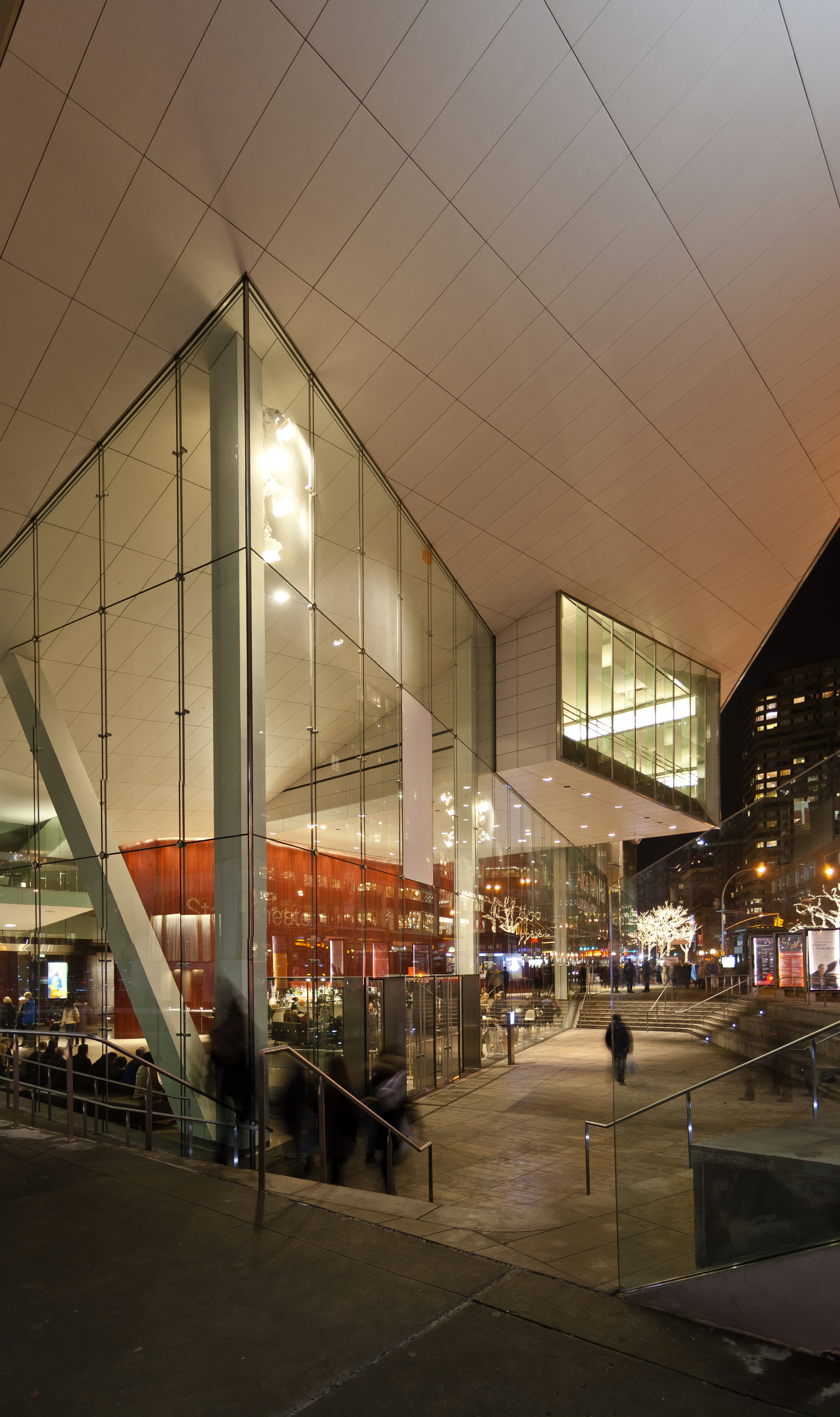
The new outdoor plaza and entry to Alice Tully Hall

As part of the Lincoln Center Redevelopment Project, the Juilliard School needed another 45,000 square feet (4,200 m^{2}) of space and wanted Alice Tully Hall's interiors and public spaces to be more welcoming. The expansion by Diller Scofidio + Renfro and FXFOWLE extended the travertine cladding of the original building along the West 65th Street facade, and also created an adapted extension of the Brutalist geometries on the upper stories. The fourth-story row of recesses housing windows is extended, but with the glass displaced and extending beyond the recesses, differentiating the extension from the original building and subtly beginning to break the original Brutalist box. The Juilliard extension cantilevers over a sunken public plaza and a new 38-foot-6-inch-high glazed lobby. The underside of the extension tilts up at a 16-degree angle. A dance studio punches through the curtain wall, overlooking Broadway. The transparency of the entry makes it feel like an extension of the Broadway sidewalk. A grandstand of bleacher-style seating on the far corner of the plaza rises at a similar angle to the canopy.

Structural glazed walls bring daylight into three stories of rehearsal space and classrooms in the extension, and the protruding dance studio is suspended beneath its soffit. East-west running trusses were installed between the third and sixth levels to carry the load for the four floors of the expansion, the longest of which has a 75-foot (23 m) back span with a 50-foot (15 m) cantilever. Some of the trusses’ diagonals needed to be offset to accommodate doors, passageways, and other obstructions. Steel diagonal brace frames extend from the ground to the roof to support the lateral load.

Acoustician Mark Holden and his team measured every surface of the old performance hall to determine which were re-radiating the noise of the subway, and found that the stage and seating floors, and proscenium stage's vertical panels were the responsible members. The new floors sit on a floating concrete slab with a rubber pad, and the spin walls are mounted on giant rubber isolators, which work to mitigate the sounds of the subway.

=== Significance ===
Elizabeth Diller called Lincoln Center the “place that architects love to hate,” but said that DS+R wanted to give it a “second chance.” It had long been criticized by the architectural community, due to the general dissatisfaction with the complex's overall feeling of detachment from its urban environment (the consequence of an antiquated architectural and planning ideology), the unsavory forms of the main theatre buildings, and the inadequacies of the actual performance spaces. The Juilliard Building, by comparison, received far more favorable reviews, especially with regard to its performance spaces. Despite its improvements over the superblock buildings, it was not without its problems: no clear, distinct public entrance for Tully Hall, the massive exterior stair and footbridge, lack of engagement with Broadway (either its social vitality and unique diagonal shape).

The expansion of Juilliard and the comprehensive renovation of Alice Tully Hall resolve many of the original building's issues. The new Tully Hall and Juilliard building has received rave reviews, with critics who liked the original building praising the architects for “pulling off the near-impossible feat of improving a good building without subverting its finer traits.”

== See also ==
- List of concert halls
