= Lukas Biewald =

American entrepreneur (born 1981)

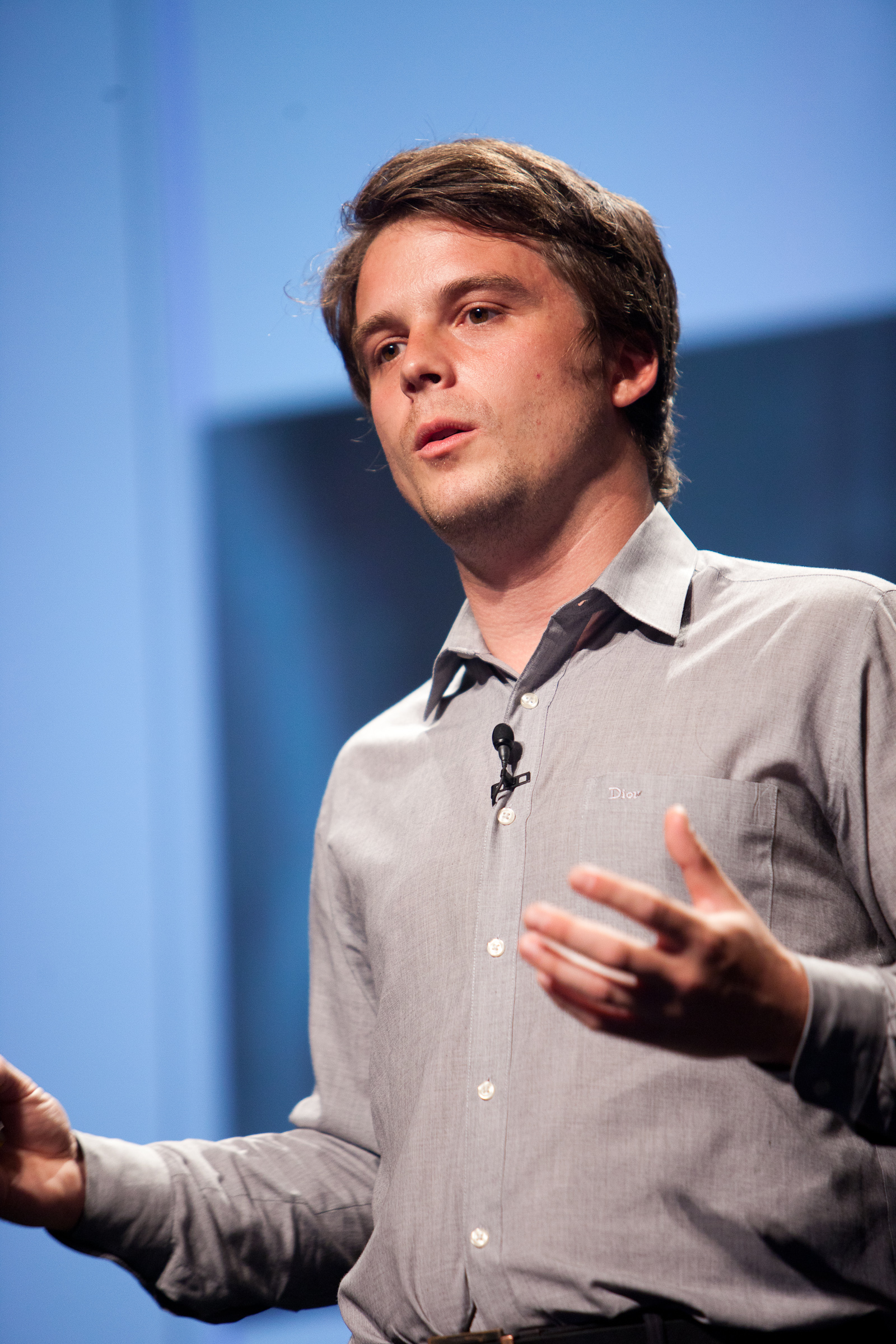
- Biewald speaking at PopTech 2011
- Born: 1981 (age 44–45); Boston, Massachusetts, United States
- Education: Master of Science in Computer Science, Stanford University
- Alma mater: Stanford University
- Occupation: Entrepreneur
- Website: lukasbiewald.com

Lukas Biewald (born 1981) is an American entrepreneur and a prominent figure in artificial intelligence. He is recognized for his contributions to machine learning and as the CEO and co-founder of Weights & Biases, a company that builds developer tools for AI, that sold to CoreWeave in 2025 for $1.7B. He previously founded and was CEO of Figure Eight, a human-in-the-loop machine learning platform. He has co-authored 26 AI research papers from 2004 through 2018.

== Early life and education ==
Biewald was born in Boston, Massachusetts in 1981. He attended Cambridge Rindge and Latin School and later earned both a Bachelor's and Master's degree in Computer science from Stanford University.

== Career ==
=== Early career ===
After graduation, Biewald joined Yahoo! as an engineer, working on machine translations to improve search results, and eventually led the Search Relevance Team for Yahoo! Japan. He later joined Powerset, a natural language search technology company, as their Senior Scientist, which was acquired by Microsoft in 2008 for an estimated $100M.

=== Figure Eight ===
In 2007, Biewald co-founded Figure Eight (formerly CrowdFlower), a data labeling and crowdsourcing company that created datasets for training machine learning models. Figure Eight was acquired by Appen in 2019 for $300 million.

=== Weights and Biases ===
In 2017, Biewald co-founded Weights & Biases with Chris Van Pelt and Shawn Lewis. The company provides tools for tracking machine learning experiments, model management, and collaborative AI and LLM app development. The platform has been adopted by organizations such as OpenAI, Salesforce, and Microsoft. In March 2025 Coreweave acquired Weights and Biases at $1.7 billion, with the transaction closing on May 5, 2025.

== Gradient Dissent ==
Biewald hosts the bi-weekly podcast Gradient Dissent. Guest have included:

- Anthony Goldbloom – Co-founder & CEO of Kaggle. “How to Win Kaggle Competitions” (podcast, Sep. 9, 2020). Shared tips on data-science competitions from the founder of the largest ML community.
- Richard Socher – Founder & CEO of You.com; former Chief Scientist at Salesforce. “The Challenges of Making ML Work in the Real World” (podcast, September 28, 2020). A leading NLP researcher, he spoke on multimodal search engines powered by large language models.
- Jensen Huang – Founder & CEO of NVIDIA. “NVIDIA’s CEO on the Next Generation of AI and MLOps” (podcast, March 3, 2022). Huang’s GPUs power modern ML research and production.
- Emad Mostaque – Co-founder & CEO of Stability AI. “Stable Diffusion, Stability AI, and What’s Next” (podcast, Nov. 15, 2022). Leads the company behind Stable Diffusion, which helped spark the generative-AI imaging boom.
- Drago Anguelov – Head of Research at Waymo. “Robustness, Safety, and Scalability at Waymo” (podcast, July 14, 2022). Covered Waymo’s self-driving AI advances and deployment challenges.
- Jeremy Howard – Co-founder of fast.ai. “The Simple but Profound Insight Behind Diffusion” (podcast, Jan. 5, 2023). Known for democratizing deep-learning education; discussed diffusion models and accessible AI tooling.
- Aidan Gomez – Co-founder & CEO of Cohere. “Scaling LLMs and Accelerating Adoption” (podcast, April 20, 2023). Co-author of “Attention Is All You Need,” he shared how Cohere delivers large-scale NLP models as a service.
- Chelsea Finn – Stanford Assistant Professor (AI & Robotics). “Shaping the World of Robotics with Chelsea Finn” (podcast, February 15, 2024). A pioneer in meta-learning and robotics, she detailed robots learning complex tasks like cooking.
- Andrew Feldman – Co-founder & CEO of Cerebras Systems. "Launching the Fastest AI Inference Solution" (podcast, August 27, 2024). Described wafer-scale AI chips achieving new training performance records.
- Thomas Dohmke – CEO of GitHub. “GitHub CEO on Copilot and the Future of Software Development” (podcast, June 10, 2025). Discussed building Copilot and the future of AI-assisted coding.
- Martin Shkreli – Founder of Godel Terminal. “From Pharma to AGI Hype, and Developing AI in Finance: Martin Shkreli’s Journey” (podcast, May 20, 2025). Shkreli reflects on his pharma controversies, prison experience, and his new AI-driven trading platform.
- Jarek Kutylowski – Founder & CEO of DeepL. “How DeepL Built a Translation Powerhouse with AI” (podcast, July 8, 2025). Shared how DeepL’s neural-MT rivals Google Translate through model and infrastructure innovation.

== Awards and recognition ==
- In 2010, Lukas Biewald won the Netexplorateur Award for creating the GiveWork iPhone app, which allows users to perform small tasks that assist refugees and people in developing countries.
- In 2010, Inc Magazine included Biewald and Van Pelt on its list of the Top 30 Entrepreneurs Under 30.

== Publications ==
- Ensuring quality in crowdsourced search relevance evaluation: The effects of training question distribution by John Le, Andy Edmonds, Vaughn Hester, Lukas Biewald. SIGIR 2010 Workshop on Crowdsourcing for Search Evaluation, July 2010.
- Superficial Data Analysis: Exploring Millions of Social Stereotypes by Lukas Biewald, Brendan O’Connor. O’Reilly July 2009
- Biewald has co-authored 26 AI research papers from 2004 through 2018.
