= 3form =

Citizen science project

3form Free Knowledge Exchange is one of the earliest examples of human-based computation and human-based genetic algorithm. It uses both human-based selection and three types of human-based innovation (contributing new content, mutation, and recombination), in order to implement collaborative problem-solving between humans.

== See also ==
- LinkedIn Answers
- Human-based Genetic Algorithm
