= Disaggregated work =

Business model

Disaggregated work is a work divided into its elemental activities, which can be reassembled using alternative solutions, for example by automating some of the activities and getting rid of or changing other activities. The concept can be applied on the scale of an individual, a department, a company, or an entire industry. During the Industrial Revolution, disaggregation often entailed replacing tradespeople such as blacksmiths, carpenters, and weavers with steam-powered machines operated by unskilled laborers.

Modern-day disaggregated labor market is organized via crowdsourcing internet websites or mobile apps maintained by for-profit firms acting as labor market intermediaries, like Amazon Mechanical Turk that offers work in a piecemeal fashion, or freelance services like TaskRabbit or Fiverr that offer gigs to freelance contractors. These services resemble the simplest models of labor markets, with the work relationships that became traditional during the last century being largely absent: no benefits, no medical insurance, no unions, no career concerns, and so on.

== Shared workspaces ==
While many of the modern disaggregated jobs can be done remotely, some disaggregated workers prefer to have a semblance of an office. They are catered to by a new breed of services that provide shared workspaces and invite the workers to participate in a larger office culture, sheltering them from "a pervasive sense of alienation".

== Online communities ==
The growth of contingent labor increased the importance of digital communication networks. As employers are distancing themselves from workers—for example through subcontractor arrangements—the workers meet in digital common spaces to "fill the information gap that characterizes disaggregated work on platforms".
