= End Citizens United =

American political action committee

- Formation: 2015; 11 years ago
- Headquarters: Washington, D.C.
- President and executive director: Tiffany Muller
- Website: endcitizensunited.org

End Citizens United (ECU) is a political action committee in the United States. The organization works to reverse the U.S. Supreme Court's 2010 decision in Citizens United v. Federal Election Commission, which deregulated limits on independent expenditure group spending for or against specific candidates in elections. It is focused on driving larger campaign donations out of politics, with the goal of electing "campaign-finance reform champions" to Congress by contributing to and raising money for these candidates, as well as running independent expenditures.

== History ==
End Citizens United was founded in 2015, operating in its first election cycle during 2016 with more than $25 million in funding.

The organization has endorsed Democratic candidates such as Zephyr Teachout, Hillary Clinton, Russ Feingold, Beto O'Rourke, Elizabeth Warren, and Jon Ossoff. For the 2016 election, it was one of the largest outside groups funding the campaigns of U.S. Senators Maggie Hassan and Catherine Cortez Masto, spending a combined $4.4 million on the races. By mid-2017, End Citizens United had raised more than $7.5 million from grassroots donations, and planned to raise $35 million for the 2018 election cycle.

During the 2018 elections, End Citizens United organized a no corporate PAC pledge, and around 185 Democratic candidates agreed not to take corporate PAC money, including Alexandria Ocasio-Cortez, Cory Booker, and Kamala Harris.

== Criticism ==
End Citizens United has received criticism from other campaign reform groups over their aggressive fundraising tactics. In early 2018, an anonymous U.S.-based contractor paid at least 3,800 micro job workers to manipulate search results when people searched for the PAC via Google, to remove a negative HuffPost article from the front page of Google's search results.

== See also ==
- Campaign finance reform in the United States
