= Ghost work =

Type of conditions of computer work

Ghost work is work performed by a human, but believed by a customer to be performed by an automated process. The term was coined by anthropologist Mary L. Gray and computer scientist Siddharth Suri in their 2019 book, Ghost Work: How to Stop Silicon Valley from Building a New Global Underclass.

== Definition ==
Gray and Suri state that ghost work focuses on task-based and content-driven work that can be funneled through the Internet and application programming interfaces (APIs). They say that this work can include labelling, editing, and sorting information or content, as well as content moderation.

They also state that ghost work can be performed remotely and on a contractual basis and that it is an invisible workforce, scaled for those who desire full-time, part-time, or ad-hoc work. A benefit of ghost work is flexible hours because the worker chooses when they complete a task, making it an appealing option for those in between jobs or in need of side work.

Ghost work is differentiated from gig work or temporary work because it is task-based and uncredited. While gig work involves a general platform, ghost work emphasizes the software or algorithm aspect of assisting machines to automate further. Through labelling content, ghost workers teach the machine to learn. Ghost workers at Amazon have found ways to help each other and self-organize, often through WhatsApp groups where they mobilize to push for changes to the platform.

== False perception ==
According to Lilly Irani, an associate professor of labor at the University of California, San Diego, the computer science world and tech companies are invested in producing the image of technological magic. She says that MTurk– Amazon's task/ gig recruiting platform– hides the people involved in the production, whose visibility could otherwise obstruct this favorable perception. Her view is that this perception isn't only aimed at the public image of the company but also at investors, who are significantly more likely to back businesses built on scalable technology, rather than unwieldy work forces demanding office space and minimum wages. In addition, she feels that there is a strong belief that these workers are a stopgap until better AI reduces the need for relying on humans for such tasks. Despite the belief, the market for ghost work doesn't show apparent signs of declining. The ghost work industry will potentially grow even more in the upcoming years.
