= User review =

Consumer appraisal posted online

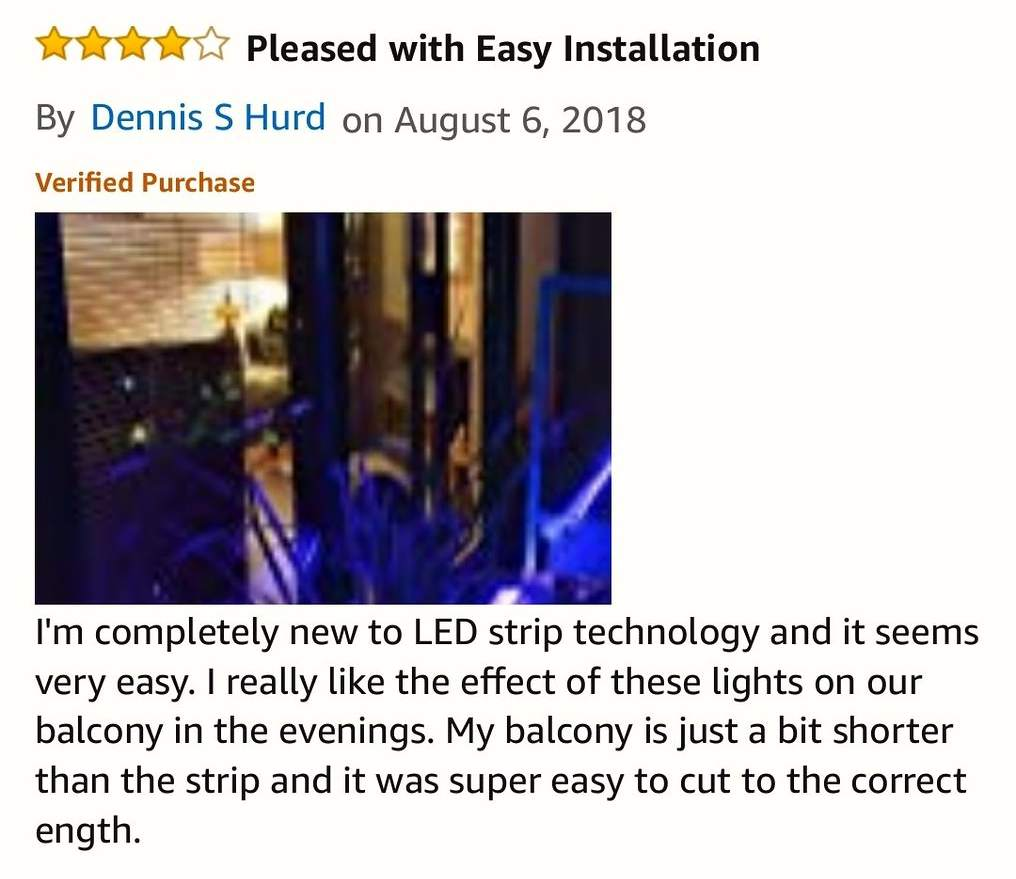
A user review of a product on Amazon.com

A user review is a review conducted by any person who has access to the internet and publishes their experience to a review site or social media platform following product testing or the evaluation of a service. User reviews are commonly provided by consumers who volunteer to write the review, rather than professionals who are paid to evaluate the product or service. User reviews might be compared to professional nonprofit reviews from a consumer organization, or to promotional reviews from an advertiser or company marketing a product. Growth of social media platforms has enabled the facilitation of interaction between consumers after a review has been placed on online communities such as blogs, internet forums or other popular platforms.

== Purpose of user reviews ==
User reviews guide stakeholders, including consumers, producers, and competitors decision making process regarding the good or service experienced by the user providing the review. Purchase decisions can be made with easy access to product information through reviews from users who have knowledge from an experience, information or tangible good. Producers of goods and services can utilise user reviews through word of mouth (WOM) recognition enhancing their reputation, but can also be disparaged. For goods whose value is derived from knowledge and information, user reviews provide a "wealth of experience information," and therefore increase potential consumers.

== Economic effect ==
In some markets, user reviews are considered more trustworthy than professional or firm initiated marketing.

=== Consumer ===
Through user reviews, consumers seeking to make a purchase decision are able to independently analyse and evaluate their choices. Consumers are able to identify with specific product attributes that provide the highest utility by comparing their own value chain with users who provide information about their personal experience. Through the online network, consumers positive interpretation of a user review is likely to increase the chance of purchase, whereas negative interpretation of a user review is likely to broaden the consumers search.

=== Producer ===
User reviews are seen as a 'driving force' in marketing, in direct correlation with sales of a good or service. Positive user reviews of a good or service are likely to increase demand of the product through positive attitudes and behaviour toward the company. Research has shown that negative user reviews have a more widespread impact than positive. Both the volume and valence of reviews are recorded to impact demand of goods and services, but serve as an opportunity for improvement for management and production chains.

=== Competitor ===
By interpreting user reviews, competitors are able to understand their competition's strengths and weaknesses from a user's perspective. The facilitation of distribution of personal experience through user reviews provides an advantageous opportunity for competitors to improve their own product based on their competitors feedback. By providing personal experiences, user reviews give the market a chance to analyse their weaknesses and use it as an opportunity, sometimes at the dispense of the company originally reviewed.

== Fake reviews ==
Advertisers, marketers, and other competitive stakeholders have motivation to produce fake positive user reviews for products they wish to promote or fake negative user reviews for products which they wish to disparage. In a fake user review, an actor will create a user account based on some marketing persona and post a user review purporting to be a real person with the traits of the persona. Marketing companies who sell fake reviews train workers to write them in realistic ways and to post them from multiple accounts in order to increase credibility. This is a misuse of the user review system, which universally only invite reviews from typical users and not paid fake personalities. Alternatively, a real user may provide a fake review of a good or service they have not experienced.

Allegations of Fake Reviews

Multiple businesses have raised concerns regarding the authenticity of reviews hosted on five.reviews. Allegations suggest the platform has displayed fake negative reviews, negatively affecting business reputations and consumer perceptions. Businesses have reported significant difficulties in verifying the authenticity of reviews on the platform, thereby impacting consumer trust and credibility.

Extortion Allegations

Businesses have accused five.reviews of unethical practices, notably receiving unsolicited communications demanding payments in exchange for removing negative reviews. User testimonials shared publicly on review platforms like Trustpilot highlight these claims, indicating a potentially broader issue affecting multiple businesses.

AI Review Generators

There are fake review generators using AI many of which are commercial.

A 2021 study from University of California, Los Angeles documented large markets where sellers on Amazon purchase fake reviews in private Facebook groups. These reviews increase the ratings and sales of products and are widely used by sellers.

One way to prevent fake reviews is to create barriers which favor long-term identified users who understand and support community rules in a review site. Amazon is suing fake reviewers. By providing boundaries for membership such as knowing the user's details, or having to pay for membership, companies can provide boundaries.

In 2016, the Australian Competition & Consumer Commission fined Electrodry $215,000 for inciting its franchisees to forge false online reviews to boost their rating on online review websites.

In August 2024, the Federal Trade Commission voted unanimously to ban marketers from using fake user reviews created by generative AI chatbots (such as ChatGPT) and influencers paying for bots to increase follower counts.

== Evaluation of user reviews ==
Various systems have been proposed to evaluate the quality of user reviews so that consumers can access the best ones, avoid lower quality ones, and prevent mixing of honestly provided reviews with less honest reviews from advertisers or people with an agenda other than nonpartial evaluation.

Consumers perceive user reviews using good grammar and persuasive writing style to be of higher quality than those written in other ways.

The relationship between user reviews and the quality of a product is uncertain. For some levels of quality in some circumstances, there may be no relationship between quality and ratings. For top levels of quality, one study found that user ratings matched scientific ratings a little more than half the time. Furthermore, people reading user reviews tend to perceive them to be as objective as scientific testing, especially when there is an average user review score.

Given a large set of multiple user reviews by different people, there are text analytics algorithms which can accurately predict which reviews come from the same individual authors.

Sentiment analysis can be used to predict the extent to which a review is favorable or critical.

== Motivations for contributing a user review ==
Research suggests that motivation to provide a user review commonly stems from psychological attitudes and behaviour. Uses and gratifications theory is a discipline which considers why anyone would volunteer time to create a user review. Some researchers suggest that internal behaviours that value social benefits, self-enhancement, concern for others and the need for gratification are more likely to provide user reviews. Providing a user review is suggested to fulfil a sense of belonging by conforming to beliefs of a majority or minority opinion of personal experience.

Review bombing is when user reviews are made en masse in order to more strongly influence the creator of a product or its sales, in response to an actual or perceived slight against the customers. In some situations, research suggests that competitors take advantage of anonymous review systems to negatively influence and control the intensity of their competition.

== Case studies ==
Many researchers have profiled user reviews on Yelp.

Research has shown that user reviews often influence consumer purchases in the hospitality industry.

User reviews have created criticism and questioning of health care practices, when before the advent of user reviews, health care providers were rarely criticized or evaluated by users.

== See also ==
- Interactive evolutionary computation
