= No corporate PAC pledge =

American political pledge

The no corporate PAC pledge is a pledge taken by some politicians in the United States to not accept political donations from corporate political action committees (PACs). The rejection of corporate PAC money can increase grassroots support for a candidate. According to political activist Saikat Chakrabarti, "not taking corporate money is a core part of the progressive message".

The trend of pledging not to take corporate PAC money has been increasing. In 2018, three-quarters of Democratic Party challengers in "top races" rejected corporate PAC money.

== Pledges and proposed reforms ==
Refusing corporate PAC donations does not necessarily mean a candidate does not take corporate-linked funds, with candidates who take the pledge still open to accepting corporate funds from Leadership PACs or benefiting from Super PACs, and may actually obscure candidates' support toward influential industries.

Other examples of pledges include the more general "No PAC pledge," which includes union PACs, issue-based, and ideological PACS; "No closed-door fundraisers or donor perk" pledges refusing to attend donor events and offering perks or access to donors that can pay a premium; "No lobbyist money" pledge refusing contributions from registered federal lobbyists; "No fossil fuel money" pledge; pledging to disclose bundlers that organize large packages of individual donations; and the "No Super PAC" pledge.

Proposed campaign finance reforms in recent years include the "Ban Corporate PACS Act" introduced most recently in 2025 by Senators Mark Kelly and Elissa Slotkin, and the "Abolish Super PACs Act" in the House of Representatives also introduced in 2025 that would cap contributions to Super PACs at $5,000. Maine adopted a similar measure limiting contributions to Super PACs by a ballot initiative in 2024, now undergoing legal scrutiny in federal court.

== Elections ==
Former president Barack Obama rejected corporate PAC money in 2008. However, it was not a common thing to do until around 2018.

During the 2018 elections, End Citizens United organized a "no corporate PAC money" pledge. Around 185 Democratic candidates agreed not to take corporate PAC money, including Alexandria Ocasio-Cortez, Cory Booker, and Kamala Harris. In 2018, there were two Republicans that also took the pledge.

During the 2020 elections, around 155 candidates agreed not to take corporate PAC money. As of December 2020, the pledge had been taken by 52 sitting members of the U.S. House of Representatives.

== PACs ==
End Citizens United is the PAC that originally organized the pledge. The Justice Democrats is another PAC that supports candidates who pledge not to take corporate PAC money.

== Circumvention ==
Some congresspeople circumvent the pledge. Congresswoman Elaine Luria (D-VA) was criticized for backing out of the pledge after achieving office. Around six House Democrats that took the pledge used a shell PAC to obfuscate that they were receiving corporate PAC money. Some of the signers of the pledge accepted funding from the New Democrat Coalition PAC, which itself receives funding from corporations. The Atlantic points out that many non-incumbent candidates are unable to attract corporate donations, so making the pledge is mostly symbolic. Another loophole is that the pledge does not require denying donations from corporate executives.

In addition, candidates can legally claim to not take corporate PAC money and still take money from trade associations that are funded by stockholders or administrative personnel of corporations. Corporate PACs are also funded by stockholders or administrative personnel of a corporation and are set up as for-profit companies that can only represent one corporation, whereas trade associations can take money from multiple companies, their employees, and stockholders. Through this loophole, many politicians can legally claim their campaigns do not take money from corporate PACs but take money from trade associations that still represent the interest of certain corporations.

== See also ==
- Campaign finance reform in the United States
