= Figure Eight Inc. =

American software company

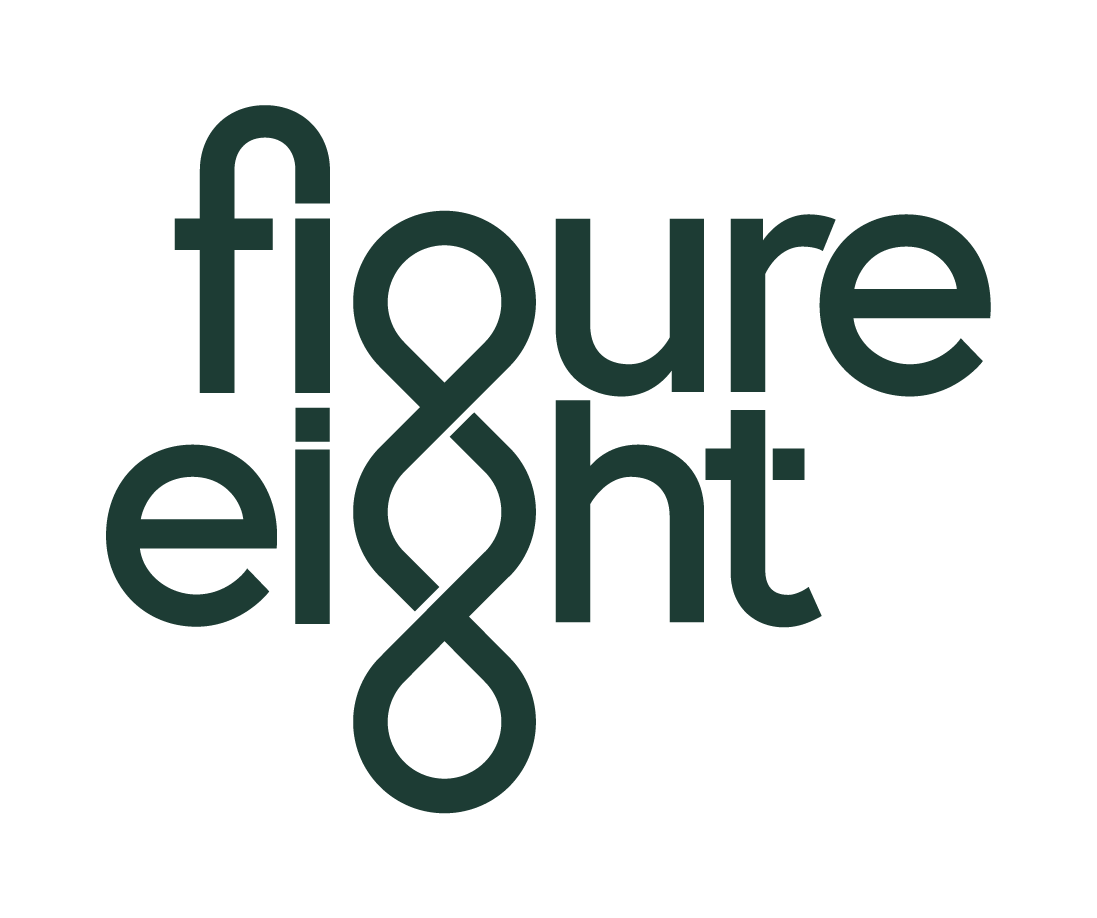
- Industry: Machine learning and artificial intelligence
- Founded: December 2007
- Founder: Lukas Biewald; Chris Van Pelt
- Defunct: 2020
- Fate: Acquired by Appen
- Headquarters: San Francisco, California, United States
- Number of employees: 500–1000
- Parent: Appen
- Website: www.figure-eight.com

Figure Eight (formerly known as Dolores Labs, CrowdFlower) was an American multinational human-in-the-loop machine learning and artificial intelligence company based in San Francisco, California.

Figure Eight technology uses human intelligence to do simple tasks such as transcribing text or annotating images to train machine learning algorithms.

Figure Eight's software automates tasks for machine learning algorithms, which can be used to improve catalog search results, approve photos or support customers and the technology can be used in the development of self-driving cars, intelligent personal assistants and other technology that uses machine learning.

In March 2019, Figure Eight was acquired by Appen for $300 million.

== History ==
=== Establishment ===
Originally called Dolores Labs, the company was founded in 2007 by Lukas Biewald and Chris Van Pelt. They found a need for temporary workers doing simple tasks that could not be automated. After experimenting with pictures and questions related to them on Amazon's Mechanical Turk, a crowdsourcing internet marketplace, they encouraged others to participate in their experimentation through the site Facestat. They collected 20 million assessments of people's faces within three months and began to add queries for companies needing data such as event listing site Zvents and O'Reilly Media.

Dolores Labs, initially in a loft space in the Mission District briefly moved to an office on Valencia Street which it outgrew in nine months. They felt the name Dolores Labs was too research-oriented and sounded like experimentation, so the company was renamed CrowdFlower. In 2009, CrowdFlower held an official launch at the TechCrunch50 conference. A sleek logo replaced its previous mint-eating alligator. The company moved to its third office in the Mission in early 2010. The name Dolores Labs was adopted by Dan Scholnick of Trinity Ventures who turned the name and previous office space into a co-working and startup incubator space.

=== Disaster relief ===
In 2009, the company provided work for refugees in Kenya who completed microtasks; iPhone users donated their time by checking for accuracy through the app Give Work. After the 2010 Haiti earthquake, CrowdFlower again worked with Samasource to help Haitians find work through the application GiveWork.

=== Funding and expansion ===
Founders Lukas Biewald and Chris Van Pelt were included on Inc.'s 30 Under 30 list in 2010.

In 2011, CrowdFlower raised a Series B funding round that totaled $9.3 million and included investor Harmony Venture Partners. The company's Series C funding, which closed in September 2014, totaled $12.5 million. In 2014, CrowdFlower was named Best in Show at FinovateFall.

The company established a scientific advisory board in 2016, which made up of entrepreneur Barney Pell, founder and CEO of Kaggle Anthony Goldbloom, and staff research engineer at Google, Pete Warden. That same year, it raised a $10 million Series D funding round led by Microsoft Ventures, Canvas Ventures and Trinity Ventures. The following year, CrowdFlower raised $20 million in a venture capital round led by Industry Ventures and included Salesforce Ventures, Canvas Ventures, Microsoft Ventures, and Trinity Ventures. The company announced its international expansion with an office in Israel in October 2016.

CrowdFlower was named to the 2017 list of Cool Vendors released by Gartner. That same year, it received AWS Machine Learning Competency status from Amazon Web Services. In 2018, CrowdFlower was included on the Forbes list of 100 Companies Leading the Way in A.I.

=== Sale and dissolution ===
The company raised $58 million in venture capital and was acquired by Appen in March 2019 for $300 million. In 2020, Appen announced that it had "successfully transitioned all former Figure Eight assets."

== Technology ==
In June 2012, the company released version 2.0 of its Real Time Foto Moderator which checks photographs for adult or inappropriate content. The new version included two different "rule sets" to determine appropriate photos including a stricter rule set and one that is more flexible. The update also added an option for moderators to specify why a photo is rejected. That same year, Parse partnered with CrowdFlower to add photo moderation to its backend services designed for mobile app development.

In November 2014, CrowdFlower announced that it was releasing support for eight new languages crowds to its platform, making twelve available language crowds at the time.

In 2015, CrowdFlower AI launched at the Rich Data Summit. The AI platform combines machine learning and human-labeled training data to create data sets used for predictive models.

In 2015, CrowdFlower announced the Data For Everyone initiative, which included a collection of data sets available to researchers and entrepreneurs.

== Partners and collaboration ==
Microsoft partnered with CrowdFlower in October 2016 to create a "human-in-the-loop" platform using Microsoft Azure Machine Learning. In May 2017, CrowdFlower released an enhancement for its Computer Vision software, announced during the Train AI conference, designed to simplify and speed up the process of annotating images.

Figure Eight held TrainAI, a conference held in San Francisco. In 2017, the company launched AI for Everyone at the TrainAI conference. AI For Everyone is a contest run by Figure Eight for non-profit ventures and scientific research that aims to improve society by awarding $1 million in prize money that will go toward projects using AI. Six winners have been announced as of February 2018 to projects ranging from computer vision for cancer research to natural language processing for hate speech.

The company was a Machine Learning Competency Partner in Amazon's AWS Machine Learning Partner Solutions program. Figure Eight works with companies such as Autodesk, Google, Facebook, Twitter, Cisco Systems, GitHub, Mozilla, VMware, eBay, Etsy, Toyota and American Express.
