= Macrotasking =

Macrotasking is a type of crowdsourcing that is distinct from microtasking. Macrotasks typically have the following characteristics:

- they can be done independently
- they take a fixed amount of time
- they require special skills

Microtasking projects can also be small pieces of a much larger whole, which workers never see, while macrotasks could be part of a large, visible project where workers pitch in wherever they have the required skills.

A macrotask might be the creation of an analytical paper or a video, or the pursuit of a contest like the Netflix Prize, while a microtask could include the editing of a document for grammar or transcription of a video.

A number of sites connect people with freelancers who can fulfill macrotasks, like Fiverr, Upwork (ex Elance and oDesk) . Companies like Sparked and Radmatter have commercial products which can be used for macrotasking.

The Department of State has a crowd-work platform called the Virtual Student Foreign Service where employees can post macro and micro tasks for student interns to accomplish.

== Sources ==
- Crowdsourcing For Dummies – David Alan Grier
- Becker, J.D.; (et al.) Parallelism, Learning, Evolution: Workshop on Evolutionary Models and Strategies, Neubiberg, Germany, March 10-11, 1989. Workshop on Parallel Processing: Logic, Organization, and Technology - WOPPLOT 89, Wildbad Kreuth, Germany, July 24-28, 1989. Proceedings.
