= Micro job =

Small paid freelance task

Advertisements by workers on Fiverr, a micro job platform

A micro job is a small paid freelance task selected from a centralized platform. The practice of working micro jobs is called microemployment, and people doing micro jobs are called microemployees. These jobs can be online or in-person: for example, acting as a virtual assistant, handyman, or nanny; or doing website design, dog boarding, or errands. Personal income varies depending on the jobs taken and the fee charged by the platform offering the jobs.

The concept is related to that of the gig economy. The micro-job industry is part of a larger movement of companies facilitating the outsourcing of products: for example AirBNB, which lets users independently rent out houses. Microemployment sites are growing rapidly as of 2013 and form a new type on-demand income for workers. These platforms can sometimes earn billions of dollars.

== Types of tasks ==
Micro jobs are categorized into two main types: physical (location-based) and digital (online-based).

- Physical micro jobs: These include local errands such as furniture assembly, dog walking, or grocery delivery, often facilitated through platforms like TaskRabbit.
- Digital micro jobs: These consist of short online tasks such as data entry, taking surveys, or website testing. They are frequently used for content moderation and "human-in-the-loop" processes where human judgment is required for tasks that algorithms cannot yet perform reliably.

== Role in Artificial Intelligence ==
In the 21st century, micro jobs have become the backbone of artificial intelligence development. Workers perform tasks known as "data labeling" or "tagging," where they identify objects in images or transcribe audio to train machine learning models.

Anthropologist Mary L. Gray and computer scientist Siddharth Suri coined the term "Ghost Work" to describe this labor, noting that while the end-user perceives an automated process, the system relies on an invisible human workforce managing tasks via APIs.

== Global demographics ==
According to the International Labour Organization, the micro-job sector is a significant source of income in developing nations. While these platforms provide low-entry barriers for highly educated individuals in regions with limited job markets, they also present challenges regarding wage protection. Average hourly earnings can be as low as US$2.1 in some regions, with many workers performing significant amounts of unpaid labor, such as searching for tasks or qualifying for tests.

== In law ==
Microemployees are classified as independent contractors under the law, meaning they are not considered employees of the companies they work for. As independent contractors, they bear full legal responsibility for their actions and compliance with applicable regulations. The law is murky, however, on the relationship between microemployees and marketplaces where workers find jobs. Lawsuits are expected to test this connection. In January 2014 the Kuang-Liu family, of San Francisco, CA, filed a wrongful death lawsuit against Uber and driver Syed Muzzafar. The accident, which caused the death of their 6-year-old daughter and injured two other family members, was allegedly caused while Muzzafar was fulfilling a driving job from Uber.

Individual auto insurance policies do not cover commercial activities, which may result in denials of claims if drivers are working for hire. To prevent legal complications, some ride service providers are requiring their drivers to purchase commercial insurance. Legislation for microemployment work issues remains unclear and unresolved.

== See also ==
- Freelancer
- Online volunteering
- Temporary work
