= Interactive evolutionary computation =

Interactive evolutionary computation (IEC) or aesthetic selection is a general term for methods of evolutionary computation that use human evaluation. Usually human evaluation is necessary when the form of fitness function is not known (for example, visual appeal or attractiveness; as in Dawkins, 1986) or the result of optimization should fit a particular user preference (for example, taste of coffee or color set of the user interface).

== IEC design issues ==
The number of evaluations that IEC can receive from one human user is limited by user fatigue which was reported by many researchers as a major problem. In addition, human evaluations are slow and expensive as compared to fitness function computation. Hence, one-user IEC methods should be designed to converge using a small number of evaluations, which necessarily implies very small populations. Several methods were proposed by researchers to speed up convergence, like interactive constrain evolutionary search (user intervention) or fitting user preferences using a convex function. IEC human–computer interfaces should be carefully designed in order to reduce user fatigue. There is also evidence that the addition of computational agents can successfully counteract user fatigue.

However IEC implementations that can concurrently accept evaluations from many users overcome the limitations described above. An example of this approach is an interactive media installation by Karl Sims that allows one to accept preferences from many visitors by using floor sensors to evolve attractive 3D animated forms. Some of these multi-user IEC implementations serve as collaboration tools, for example HBGA.

== IEC types ==
IEC methods include interactive evolution strategy, interactive genetic algorithm, interactive genetic programming, and human-based genetic algorithm.

=== IGA ===
An interactive genetic algorithm (IGA) is defined as a genetic algorithm that uses human evaluation. These algorithms belong to a more general category of Interactive evolutionary computation. The main application of these techniques include domains where it is hard or impossible to design a computational fitness function, for example, evolving images, music, various artistic designs and forms to fit a user's aesthetic preferences. Interactive computation methods can use different representations, both linear (as in traditional genetic algorithms) and tree-like ones (as in genetic programming).

== See also ==
- Evolutionary art
- Human-based evolutionary computation
- Human-based genetic algorithm
- Human–computer interaction
- Karl Sims
- Electric Sheep
- User review
