= Victor Johnston =

Irish-born psychologist

Victor S. Johnston (born 4 May 1943) is an Irish-born psychologist whose work emphasis is emotion, and event related potentials.

== Biography ==
Johnston received his B.Sc. in psychology, 1964, Queens University, Belfast, N. Ireland; and Ph.D. in psychopharmacology, 1967, University of Edinburgh, Scotland. His doctoral research on the biochemistry of Schizophrenia was awarded the A.E. Bennett Neuropsychiatric Research Foundation Award.

His areas of study include cognitive engineering, biopsychology, and cognitive psychology. His major research interests are evolutionary psychology, electrophysiology and genetic algorithms. Dr. Johnston states, "The human brain did not evolve to accurately represent the world around us; it evolved only to enhance the survival of our genes." According to Johnston, the combination of emotions with symbolic thought produces meaning. But with this capacity comes the ability to develop meanings for things that do not exist. Little girls develop the ability to attach emotional feelings to dolls, and pretend that their toys live. Little boys learn how to pretend to hunt and fight and attach emotions to them. We learn feelings of desire, fear, and wonder by wandering to the limits of our play. Imagination allows us to create technology, mathematics, and art, but with it can also come terrifying thoughts that could cause harm to us. We grow to learn the difference between most of our thoughts and what they represent, but most of us get fooled into believing the reality of some things that don't exist at all.

== Awards and honours ==
- Awarded New Mexico Software Author of the Year Award, New Mexico Entrepreneurs Association, Los Alamos and Sandia National Laboratories (1995).
- New Mexico Inventor of the Year Award (1995) for FacePrints software.
- US patent (1994) for FacePrints software that can evolve faces in a computer.
- Doctoral research on the biochemistry of Schizophrenia was awarded the A.E. Bennett Neuropsychiatric Research Foundation Award (1967)

== Academic appointments ==
- Professor, New Mexico State University, 1988–present
- Associate Professor, NMSU, 1980–1987
- Assistant Professor, NMSU, 1969–1980
- Postdoctoral Fellow, Stanford University, 1970–1971
- Co-Director of Yale in Holloman Research Facility, Yale University of Medicine, 1967–1969

== Selected works ==
=== Articles ===
- JOHNSTON, V. S., and Bradley, R. J. Molecular Pharmacology of Hallucinogens. In Wortis (Ed.) Recent Advances in Biological Psychiatry, 10, 1968.
- SMYTHIES, J. R., Johnston, V. S., & Bradley, R. J. Behavioral models of psychosis. British Journal of Psychiatry,115, 55–68,1969.
- DELGADO, J. M. R., Johnston, V. S., Wallace, J. D., and Bradley, R. J.: Operant Conditioning of Amygdala Spindling in the Free Chimpanzee. Brain Research, 22:347–362, 1970.
- JOHNSTON, V. S., Hart, M., and Howell, W. The nature of the medial wall deficit in the rat. Neuropsychologia, 12, 497–503, 1974.
- JOHNSTON, V. S., and Chesney, G. L. Electrophysiological correlates of meaning. Science, 186, 944–946, 1974.
- PRIBRAM, K. H., Day, R. U., and Johnston, V. S.: Selective Attention: Distinctive Brain Electrical Patterns produced by Differential Reinforcement in Monkey and Man. In D. I. Mostofsky (Ed.) Behavior Control and Modification of Physiological Activity, Prentice Hall, 1976.
- JOHNSTON V. S., Holcomb P. J.: Probability Learning and the P3 Component of the Visual Evoked Potential in Man. Psychophysiology 17(4):396–400, 1980.
- JOHNSTON V.S., Partridge, D., and Lopez, P. A neural theory of cognitive development. Journal of Theoretical Biology, 100, 485–509, 1983. PARTRIDGE, D., Johnston, V.S. and Lopez, P.: Computer Programs as Theories in Biology. J. Theor. Biol., 108:539-64, 1984.
- JOHNSTON, V. S., Miller, D. and Burleson, M.: Multiple P3s to Emotional Stimuli and Their Theoretical Significance. Psychophysiology, 23:684-94, 1986.
- PARTRIDGE, D., Johnston, V. S. and Lopez, P.: Experiments with a Cognitive Industrial Robot. International Journal of Man-Machine Studies, 27:435–448, 1987.
- JOHNSTON, V. S., Burleson, M., and Miller D. Emotional value and late positive components of ERP's. in Current Trends in Event-Related Potential Research. (E.E.G. Supp. 40) Eds. R. Johnson Jr., J.W. Rohrbaugh & R.Parasuraman. 1988.
- JOHNSTON, V. S.: Evaluating a New Technique for Improving Eyewitness Identification. Final Report for National Institute of Justice Grant No. 90-IJCX0025, 1990.
- JOHNSTON, V. S., and Wang, X. T.: The Relationship between Menstrual Phase and the P3 Component of ERPs. Psychophysiology, 28:400–409, 1991.
- CALDWELL, C. and Johnston, V. S.: Tracking a Criminal Through "Face-Space" with a Genetic Algorithm. In: R. K. Belew and L. B. Booker (eds), Proceedings of the Fourth International Conference on Genetic Algorithms. pgs 416–421. San Diego, CA: Morgan Kaufmann Publishers, 1991.
- WANG, X. T., Johnston, V. S., and Oliver, J. C.: Evoked Brain Potential Studies of Emotional and Cognitive Processes. Acta Psychologica Sinica, 24:406–414, 1992.
- WANG, X. T. & Johnston, V. S.: Adaptive Changes in Cognitive and Emotional Processing with Reproductive Status. Brain, Behavior and Evolution, 42:39–47, 1993.
- JOHNSTON, V. S., and Franklin, M.: Is Beauty in the Eye of the Beholder? Ethology and Sociobiology, 14(3):183–199, 1993.
- JOHNSTON, V. S. Method and apparatus for generating composites of human faces U.S. Patent # 5,375,195, 1994.
- WANG, X. T. & Johnston, V. S.: Perceived Social Context and Risk Preference: A Re-examination of Framing Effects in a Life-Death Decision Problem. Journal of Behavioral Decision Making, 8:279–293, 1995.
- JOHNSTON, V. S., and Oliver-Rodriguez, J. C: Facial Beauty and the Late Positive Component of Event-related Potentials. Journal of Sex Research. 34, 188–198, 1996.
- JOHNSTON, V. S., and Caldwell, C: Tracking a criminal suspect through face space with a genetic algorithm. In Back, T, Fogel, D, Michalewicz, Z. (eds.) Handbook of Evolutionary Computation; Oxford University Press. 1997.
- OLIVER-RODRIGUEZ, J. C., Guan, J., and Johnston, V.S. Gender differences in Late Positive components evoked by Human Faces. Psychophysiology, 36: 176–185, 1999.
- JOHNSTON, V. S. Why We Feel: The Science of Human Emotions. Perseus Press: Reading, Mass. 1999

=== Books ===
- Why We Feel, the Science of Human Emotions (2000)
