= Mary L. Gray =

American anthropologist and author (born August 5, 1969)

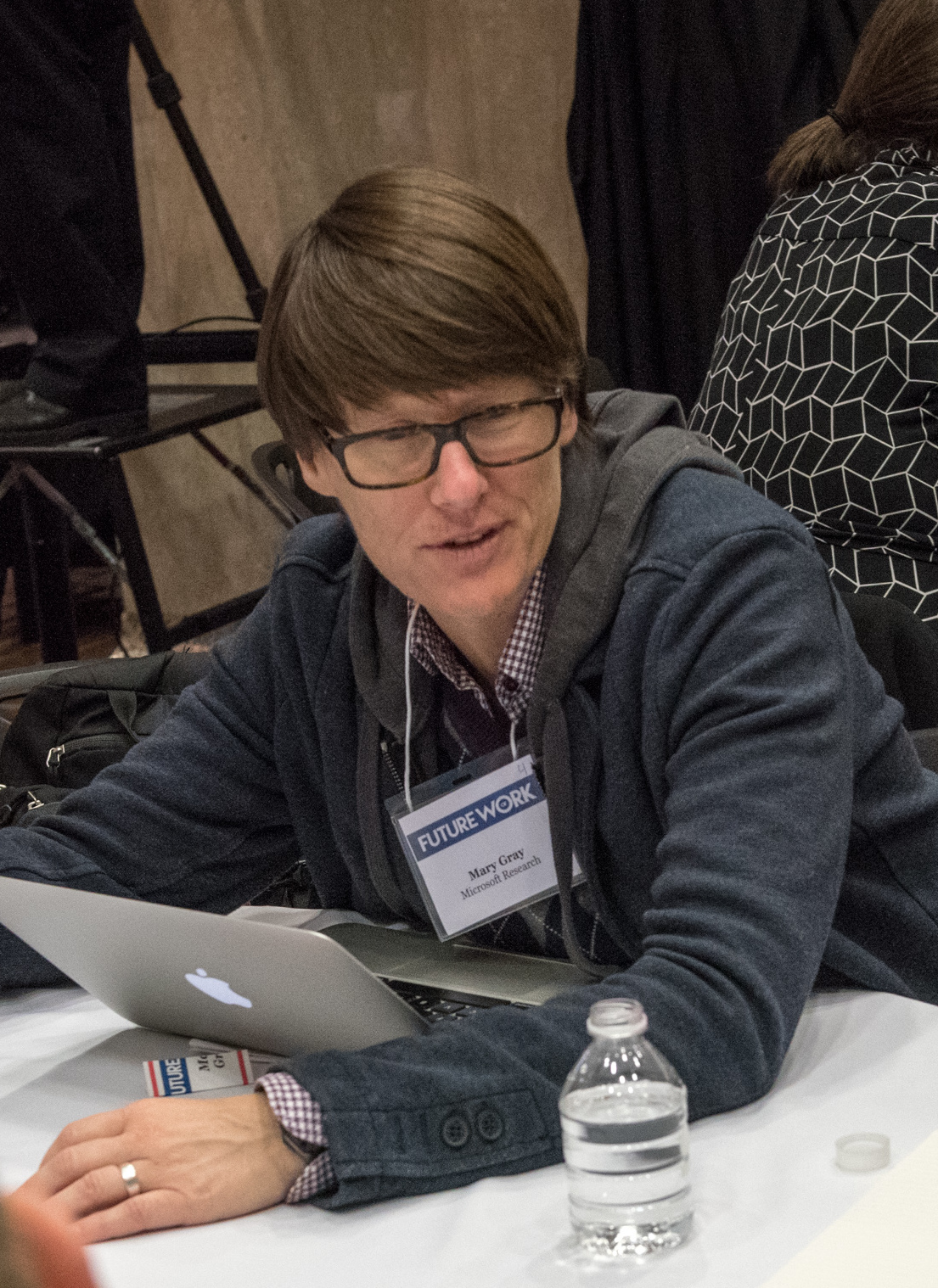
- Gray at Microsoft Research in December 2015
- Born: August 5, 1969 (age 57)
- Occupations: Anthropologist, Author
- Employer(s): Harvard University's Berkman Klein Center for Internet and Society, Microsoft Research, Indiana University
- Known for: Research on labor, identity, and human rights in the digital economy
- Awards: MacArthur Genius Grant (2020)

Academic background
- Education: University of California, Davis (B.A.), San Francisco State University (M.A.), University of California, San Diego (Ph.D.)

Mary L. Gray (born August 5, 1969) is an American anthropologist and author. She is a Fellow at Harvard University's Berkman Klein Center for Internet and Society, as well as a Senior Principal Researcher at Microsoft Research. Along with her research, Gray teaches at Indiana University, maintaining an appointment as an Associate Professor of the Media School, with affiliations in American Studies, Anthropology, and Gender Studies. In 2020, she was awarded a MacArthur Genius Grant in recognition of her work "investigating the ways in which labor, identity, and human rights are transformed by the digital economy."

== Education ==
In 1992, Gray completed a B.A. in anthropology and Native American studies at University of California, Davis. Her senior project explored the role of contemporary Alaskan Native single mothers in subsistence economies. Her advisors were David Risling and William G. Davis. In 1999, Gray earned a M.A. in anthropology from San Francisco State University. Her thesis was on queer youth narratives, the topic of her first book. Gray's advisors were John Paul De Cecco and Gilbert Herdt. She completed a Ph.D. in communication at University of California, San Diego in 2004. Gray's doctoral advisors were Susan Leigh Star and Olga Vásquez. Her dissertation was titled Coming of Age in a Digital Era: Youth Queering Technologies in Small Town, USA.

== Career ==
Gray's early works explore the experiences of LGBTQ youth, with a particular focus on the lives of those in rural areas. Her book Out in the Country: Youth, Media, and Queer Visibility in Rural America examined how queer young people use digital tools to connect with and create community, challenging the primacy of urban areas as the focus of LGBTQ experience. Gray's most recent book, Ghost Work: How to Stop Silicon Valley from Building a New Global Underclass, takes a deep dive into the depths of the "ghosts" or, human labor force, that allow some of the internet's largest websites to run smoothly. The book takes a look at big companies, like Google and Amazon, that use these "ghost workers" to do things like censor their sites while trying to pass it off as AI.

== Awards ==
- Ruth Benedict Prize
- MacArthur Fellows Program 2020

== Selected works ==
- Gray, Mary L. (1999). In Your Face: Stories from the Lives of Queer Youth. Haworth Press. ISBN 978-1-56023-887-4.
- Gray, Mary L. (2009). Out in the Country: Youth, Media, and Queer Visibility in Rural America. NYU Press. ISBN 978-0-8147-3220-5.
- Gray, Mary L.; Johnson, Colin R.; Gilley, Brian J., eds. (2016). Queering the Countryside: New Frontiers in Rural Queer Studies. NYU Press. ISBN 978-1-4798-3077-0.
- Gray, Mary L.; Suri, Siddharth (2019). Ghost Work: How to Stop Silicon Valley from Building a New Global Underclass. Houghton Mifflin Harcourt. ISBN 978-1-328-56628-7. See also Ghost Work.
