= Appen (company) =

Linguistics data company

Appen Limited
- Formerly: Appen Butler Hill
- Type: Public
- Traded as: ASX: APX; S&P/ASX 200 component
- Industry: Technology
- Founded: 1996; 30 years ago
- Founder: Julie Vonwiller
- Headquarters: Chatswood, New South Wales, Australia
- Area served: Worldwide
- Key people: Chris Vonwiller; (Non-Executive Chairman); Ryan Kolln; (Managing Director and CEO)
- Revenue: ▼US$273.0 million (2023)
- Number of employees: ▼1000 (2024)
- Subsidiaries: Crowd Gen
- Website: www.appen.com

Appen Limited is an Australian multinational company that develops datasets for building and improving artificial intelligence (AI). The company is based in Australia and publicly traded on the Australian Securities Exchange (ASX) under the code APX.

== History ==
Appen was founded in Sydney in 1996 by linguist Dr. Julie Vonwiller.

In 2011, Appen merged with the US-based Butler Hill Group to become Appen Butler Hill. Butler Hill had been founded in 1993 by Lisa Braden-Harder, a former IBM Research employee who worked on grammar checking technology.

In 2012, Appen acquired Wikman Remer, a California based firm that developed tools and platforms for employee engagement, online moderation and curation. The following year, Appen Butler Hill was re-branded as Appen and, on January 7, 2015, the company went public.

In October 2016, Appen acquired UK-based transcription services company Mendip Media Group (MMG). Appen also acquired Leapforce in November 2017 adding additional capabilities in search relevance, and, in 2019, Appen acquired Figure Eight. In 2021, Appen announced it has signed an agreement to acquire Quadrant, a global leader in mobile location data, point-of-interest data, and corresponding compliance services.

== Operations ==
Appen's customers use machine learning for a variety of use cases including automatic speech recognition (ASR), computer vision, increasing conversions in eCommerce, delivering more meaningful and personalized advertising, enhancing social media feeds or improving customer service capabilities with tools such as chatbots and virtual assistants.

Most of the company's revenues are earned offshore and its clients include eight of the top ten largest technology companies.

At the end of 2017, the company's revenue was A$166.6 million and the company had more than 350 full-time employees and over 1,000,000 flexible workers in what is known as the Appen Connect, later called Crowd Gen. Tasks are performed in more than 180 languages and 130 countries.

== Controversies ==
In February 2026, The Bureau of Investigative Journalism reported about the various contracts made between Appen and The U.S Military, including one where Somali gig-workers, whose country has been attacked by the US, were unknowingly helping build datasets used by Military; effectively criticizing Appen, and data annotation companies in general, for failure in giving information about the nature of the job and who it really is for.

== Executive ==
Appen was founded by linguist Dr. Julie Vonwiller. Vonwiller's husband Chris Vonwiller joined Appen in 2000 and is the company's Non-Executive Chairman.

Lisa Braden-Harden was CEO of Appen from the acquisition of Butler Hill Group in 2011 to 2015. In July 2015, Mark Brayan joined Appen as CEO. In December 2022, Armughan Ahmad succeeded Brayan as CEO and president. In February 2024, Ahmad resigned and was replaced as CEO by the company's COO, Ryan Kolln.

== Locations ==
The company's corporate headquarters is in Chatswood, New South Wales, Australia. The United States headquarters is in Kirkland, Washington, United States.

However, Appen has a global presence, with offices in Sunnyvale, Toronto, Beijing, Tokyo, Seoul, as well as Cavite in the Philippines, and Exeter in the United Kingdom.
