= Leila Janah =

American businesswoman (1982–2020)

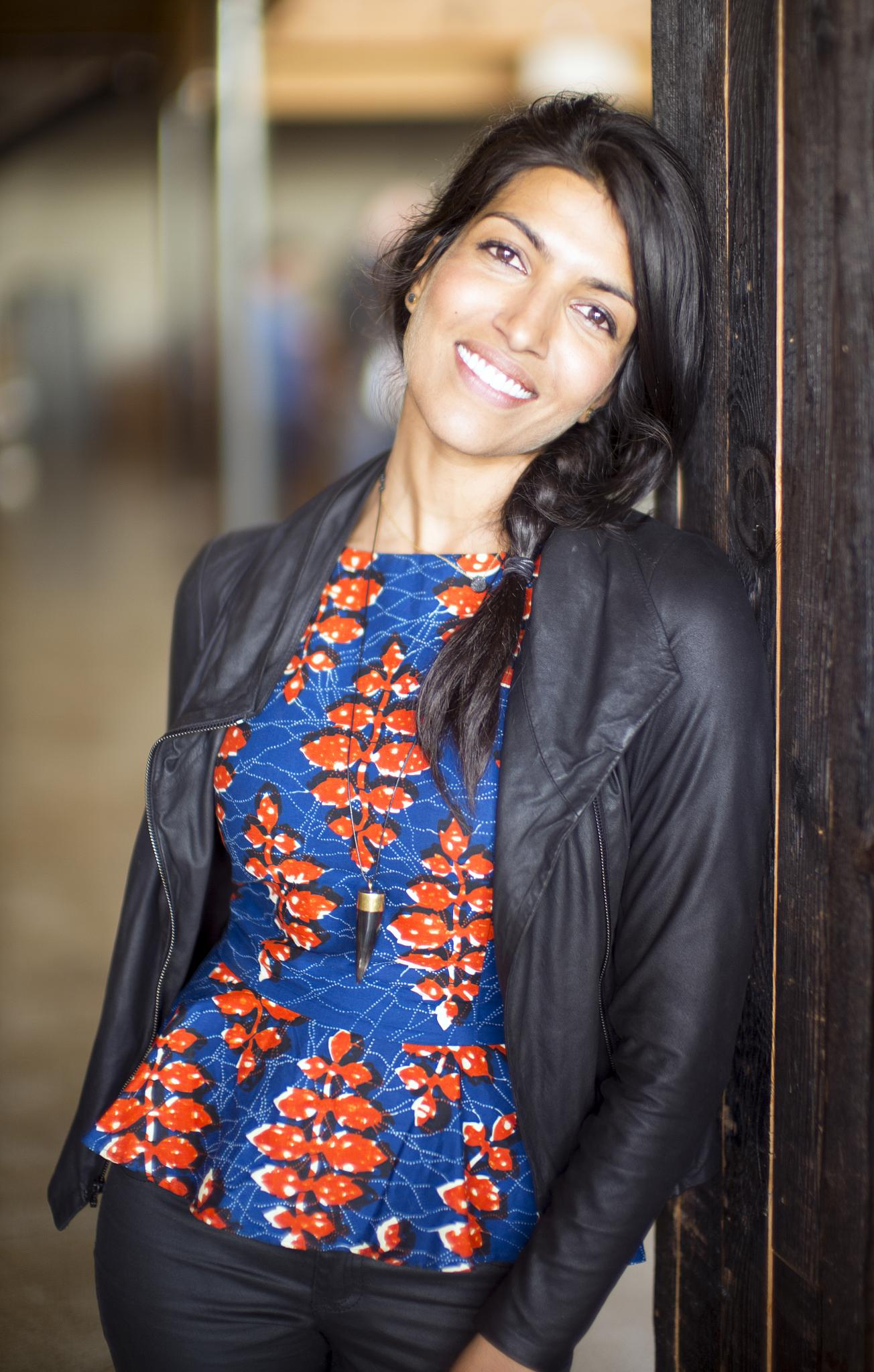
- Janah in 2014
- Born: Leila Chirayath; October 9, 1982; Lewiston, New York, U.S.
- Died: January 24, 2020 (aged 37); New York City, New York, U.S.
- Education: Harvard University
- Occupations: Founder and CEO of Sama and LXMI
- Spouse: Tassilo Festetics

Leila Janah (née Leila Chirayath; October 9, 1982 – January 24, 2020) was an American businesswoman. She was the founder and CEO of Sama and LXMI.

== Early life ==
Leila Janah was born as Leila Chirayath on October 9, 1982, in Lewiston, New York, near Niagara Falls, and grew up in San Pedro, Los Angeles, California. She was the daughter of Indian immigrants, Martine Janah and Sahadev Chirayath, a structural engineer. Janah described her childhood as being difficult, often due to a lack of financial security. As a teenager, Janah worked many jobs, including babysitting and tutoring. She changed her surname to her mother's surname around 2010.

She attended the California Academy of Mathematics and Science. She won a scholarship at 17 through American Field Services, and convinced them to let her spend it teaching in Ghana where she spent 6 months during her senior year of high school. In Ghana, Janah taught English to young students in the village of Akuapem, many of whom were blind. Janah has cited this early experience as sparking her passion for working in Africa, and she continued to visit the continent during her time in college.

Janah attended Harvard University, graduating in 2004 with a degree in development studies. While at Harvard, Janah conducted fieldwork in Mozambique, Senegal and Rwanda and was a consultant for and author of papers for the World Bank's Development Research Group and Ashoka on social and economic rights.

== Career ==
Upon graduation, Janah worked as a management consultant with Katzenbach Partners, focusing on healthcare, mobile and outsourcing companies. One of Janah's first assignments with Katzenbach Partners was managing a call center in Mumbai. At the call center Janah met a young man who traveled each day by rickshaw from Dharavi, one of the largest slums in South Asia, to work at the center. Janah has cited this experience as sparking the inspiration for Samasource, the non-profit she founded in 2008.

Janah left Katzenbach Partners in 2007 to become a visiting scholar at Stanford University with the Program on Global Justice, founded by law professor Joshua Cohen. That year, she co-founded Incentives for Global Health with Thomas Pogge, Leitner Professor of Philosophy and International Affairs at Yale, and Aidan Hollis, a professor of economics at the University of Calgary, which established a blueprint for incentivizing the development of new drugs for neglected diseases.

=== Sama ===
In 2008, Janah launched Samasource (then called Market for Change), an idea that was inspired by her time spent in Africa and her experience managing a call center in Mumbai. One of the first organizations to engage in impact sourcing, Sama workers are trained in basic computer skills and paid a local living wage for their labor.

Additionally, Sama provides a host of impact programs to ensure their workers are advancing in their careers and learning life skills. These programs include health and wellness education, professional skills development, a scholarship program to assist with continuing education costs, and the GiveWork Challenge—a program to provide micro loans and mentorship to aspiring entrepreneurs. Sama has been named one of Fast Company's "Most Innovative Companies" and counts Walmart, Google, General Motors and Microsoft among its clients.

=== Samaschool ===
In 2013, Janah founded Samaschool (previously SamaUSA), a program that moves people out of poverty by providing digital skills training and a connection to internet-based jobs that pay a living wage. Samaschool operated in-person programs in Arkansas, California, New York and Kenya, as well as online classes internationally. Samaschool courses trained students in digital literacy, workforce readiness and freelancing.

Samaschool started with a pilot program in the Bayview-Hunters Point neighborhood in San Francisco. The model originally focused on training students to perform digital work competitively, to prepare them for success on online work sites like Taskrabbit and Upwork (then oDesk and Elance). The program was first introduced in a 2011 TechCrunch article which attracted controversy for its assertion that Americans could compete with African and Asian workers who can afford to take assignments that pay lower fees. Samaschool later shifted its focus to teach students the skills necessary to gain work in the gig economy. Samaschool was funded in part by the Robinhood Foundation.

Samaschool closed operations in 2020, with the core training curriculum being acquired by a U.S. foundation.

=== Samahope ===
Janah founded Samahope in 2012, the first crowdfunding platform that directly funded doctors who provide life-changing medical treatments for women and children in poor communities. Samahope enabled anyone anywhere to directly fund doctors' life-changing medical treatments for women and children in need. Samahope was built on the belief that transparent funding mechanisms could help close the global surgery gap and ensure that all people have access to medical treatments. Samahope combined with Johnson & Johnson's new global health platform, CaringCrowd, at the close of December 2015. Janah spoke about the decision to merge with Caring Crowd in a LinkedIn post, citing efficiency and branding as the two biggest factors.

=== LXMI ===
In 2015, Janah co-founded LXMI, a for-profit luxury skin care brand. LXMI was incubated at Sama. LXMI is named after the Hindu goddess of beauty and prosperity.

== Awards and honors ==
Janah was a Young Global Leader of the World Economic Forum, a director of CARE USA, a 2012 TechFellow, recipient of the inaugural Club de Madrid Young Leadership Award, and the youngest person to win a Heinz Award in 2014 when she received the 19th Annual Heinz Award in Technology, the Economy and Employment. She also received the Secretary’s Innovation Award for the Empowerment of Women and Girls from Hillary Clinton in 2012, and was a former visiting scholar at the Stanford University Program on Global Justice and Australian National University’s Centre for Applied Philosophy and Public Ethics. She was a recipient of the Rainer Arnhold and TEDIndia Fellowships, and served on the San Francisco board of TechSoup Global and the Social Enterprise Institute.

Janah was included as one of Elle Magazine's "Women in Tech" in 2016 and The New York Times T Magazine's Five Visionary Tech Entrepreneurs Who Are Changing the World in 2015. She was also named a “Rising Star” on Forbes’ 30 Under 30 list in 2011, one of Fast Company's “Most Creative People in Business” in 2012, and was profiled as one of Fortune's "Most Promising Entrepreneurs" in 2013.

== Death ==
Janah died at the age of 37 on January 24, 2020, from epithelioid sarcoma, a rare form of cancer.
