= Kenneth Stanley =

Artificial intelligence researcher, author

Kenneth O. Stanley
- Education: University of Texas at Austin (PhD)
- Known for: Neuroevolution of augmenting topologies
- Father: Richard P. Stanley
- Scientific career
- Fields: Artificial intelligence; Neuroevolution
- Workplaces: OpenAI; Uber; University of Central Florida
- Thesis: Efficient Evolution of Neural Networks Through Complexification (2004)
- Doctoral advisor: Risto Miikkulainen
- Website: www.kenstanley.net

Kenneth Owen Stanley is an artificial intelligence researcher, author, and former professor of computer science at the University of Central Florida known for creating the Neuroevolution of augmenting topologies (NEAT) algorithm. He coauthored Why Greatness Cannot Be Planned: The Myth of the Objective with Joel Lehman which argues for the existence of the "objective paradox", a paradox which states that "soon as you create an objective, you ruin your ability to reach it". While a professor at the University of Central Florida, he was the director of the Evolutionary Complexity Research Group (EPlex) which led the development of Galactic Arms Race. He also developed the HyperNEAT, CPPNs, and novelty search algorithms. He also co-founded Geometric Intelligence, an AI research firm, in 2015.

== Early life and education ==
Kenneth Stanley is the son of Richard P. Stanley. He became interested in computer programming at the age of 8 during a summer camp. He later pursued his interest by taking AP Computer Science at Newton South High School and majoring in Computer Science at the University of Pennsylvania, graduating in 1997. He received his PhD from the University of Texas at Austin under Risto Miikkulainen in 2004 for his work developing the Neuroevolution of augmenting topologies (NEAT) algorithm.

== Work ==
In 2006, he became an associate professor of Computer Science at the University of Central Florida and later became a Charles Millican Professor in 2017.

In 2007, he created PicBreeder, a piece of software that uses NEAT to allow users to evolve pictures by randomly generating images and having the user pick which image will produce children. This allows users to shape random blobs into recognizable shapes like animals or cars. Watching the algorithm evolve what appeared to be a pair of alien eyes into an image that looked like a car led Stanley to realize that nearly every interesting image on PicBreeder evolved by way of a different looking image. This led him to develop what he calls the steppingstone principle that, "Instead of hard-coding the rules of reasoning, or having computers learn to score highly on specific performance metrics ... we must let a population of solutions blossom. Make them prioritize novelty or interestingness instead of the ability to walk or talk. They may discover an indirect path, a set of steppingstones, and wind up walking and talking better than if they'd sought those skills directly."

As the director of EPlex, he then served as the faculty advisor and as a software developer for Erin Hastings' Galactic Arms Race. First released in 2010, it is a space shooter that uses cgNEAT technology. cgNEAT or "content generating NEAT" is a variant of NEAT developed by Hastings and Stanley that "automatically generates graphical and game content while the game is played, based on the past preferences of the players".

In 2015, he coauthored Why Greatness Cannot Be Planned: The Myth of the Objective with Joel Lehman. Inspired by his work with PicBreeder and other research, they discuss how intentionally pursuing objectives can limit your success at achieving them, both for people and AI. According to the book, pursuing novelty instead of an objective is more likely to succeed in creative tasks. They argue that this could be a more effective way of funding scientific research or could as a way of running a business. It received positive reviews with one reviewer writing that, "If you are yearning to do what's interesting, rather than optimizing a 'metric' of approach to a prescribed 'objective', you will love this book."

In 2015, he co-founded Geometric Intelligence a private research and development firm focusing on artificial intelligence and machine learning with Gary Marcus, Zoubin Ghahramani, and Doug Bemis. Uber acquired the firm in late 2016 and renamed it to Uber AI labs. He continued working at the firm after its acquisition as a senior research science manager and the head of Core AI research. He left both Uber AI Labs and the University of Central Florida in 2020 to lead the Open-Endedness team at OpenAI as a Research Science Manager. In 2017, Stanley won the 2017 ISAL Award for Outstanding Paper of the Decade 2002 – 2012 for his original 2002 NEAT paper with Risto Miikkulainen. After leaving OpenAI, he co-founded Maven, an open-ended social network, where he was CEO before leaving the company three months later due to a lack of traction. As of 2025, he is SVP of open-endedness at Lila Sciences.
