= Gabriela Ochoa =

Venezuelan British computer scientist

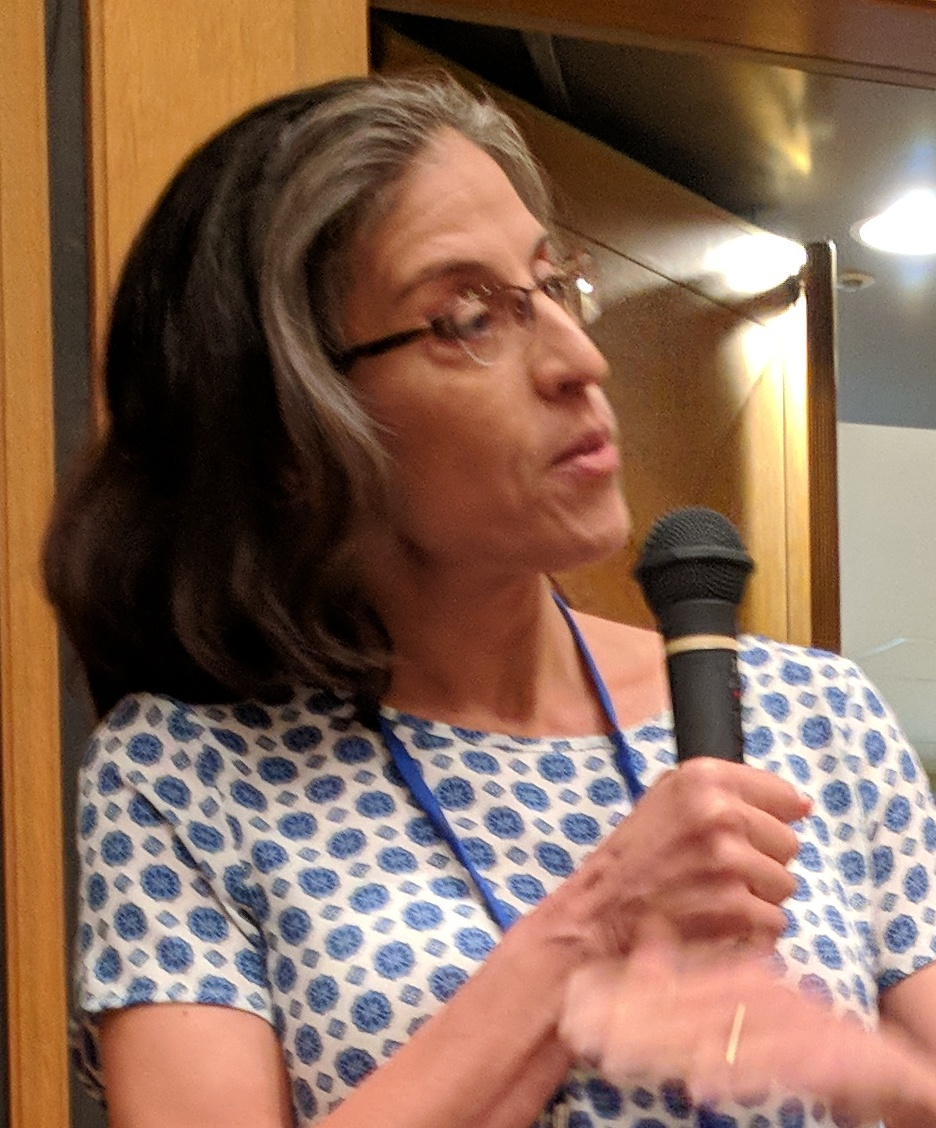
- Born: Venezuela
- Education: Simón Bolívar University (BS, MS); University of Sussex (PhD)
- Scientific career
- Workplaces: University of Stirling; University of Nottingham; Simón Bolívar University
- Thesis: Error thresholds and optimal mutation rates in genetic algorithms (2001)
- Doctoral advisor: Hilary Buxton; Inman Harvey

Gabriela Ochoa is a Venezuelan British computer scientist and Professor at the University of Stirling. Her research considers evolutionary algorithms and heuristic search methods.

== Early life and education ==
Ochoa was born in Venezuela. Her grandfather was a doctor, and she became interested in science at an early age. She earned her bachelor's degree at the Simón Bolívar University, where she remained for her master's degree and worked as a teacher's assistant. She moved to the United Kingdom for her graduate studies, where she joined the University of Sussex as a doctoral student. At Sussex Ochoa worked on genetic algorithms with Hilary Buxton and Inman Harvey. After graduating she returned to Venezuela, where she was made Associate Professor at the Simón Bolívar University.

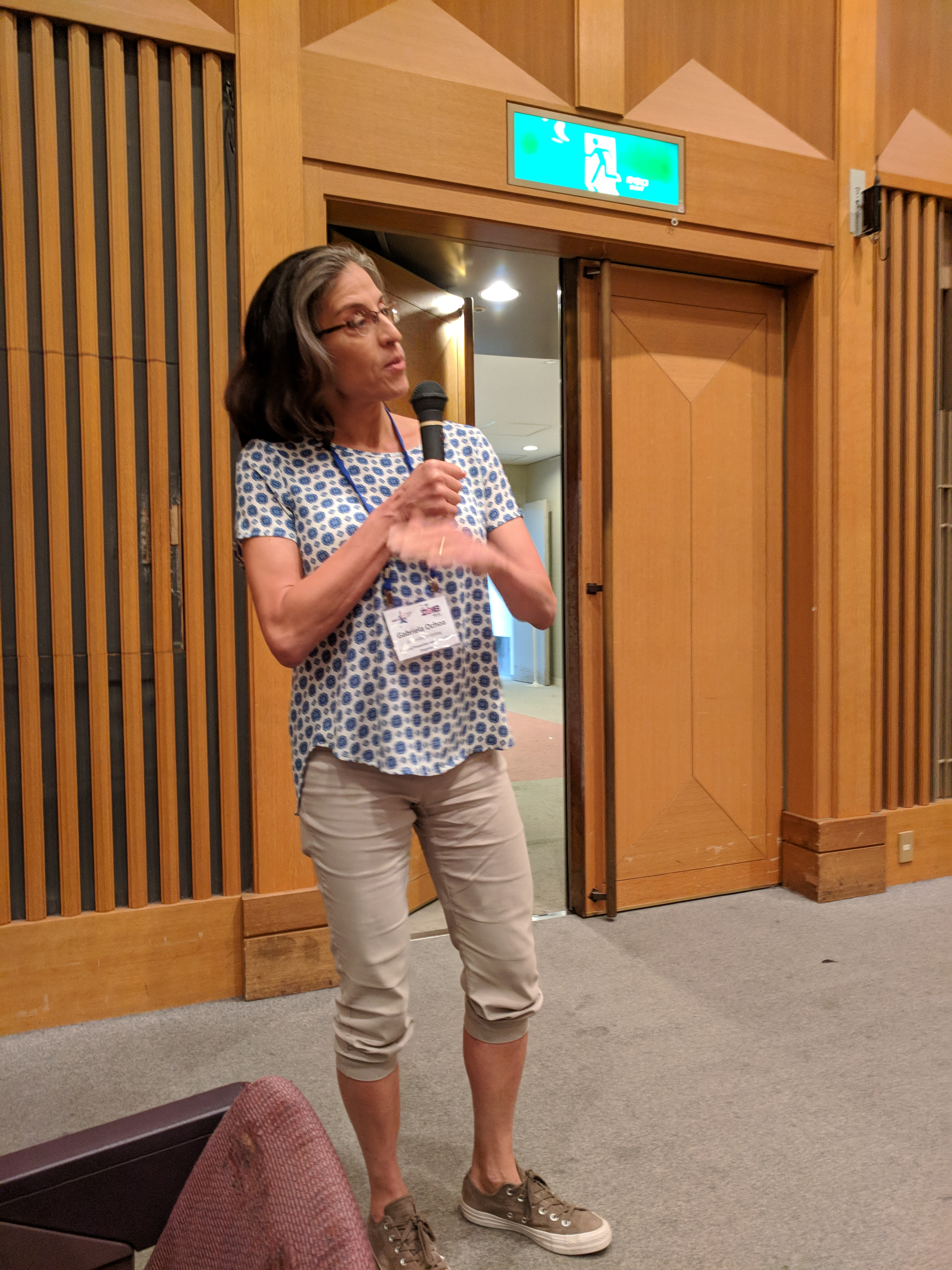
Gabriela Ochoa at GECCO 2018 in Kyoto, Japan

== Research and career ==
In 2006 Ochoa once again left Venezuela, and moved to Paris to join the French Institute for Research in Computer Science and Automation. She worked there for three months with Dr. Evelyne Lutton before joining the University of Nottingham. By 2012, Ochoa had relocated to the University of Stirling, where she was promoted to Full Professor.

Her research considers evolutionary algorithms and heuristic search methods. She has worked on the computational design of medical treatments in an effort to minimise antibiotic resistance in Scotland.

Supported by the Leverhulme Trust, Ochoa created the website Lon Maps, a space which looks to establish visualisation techniques for computational search spaces. In 2020 Ochoa was awarded the EvoStar Award for Outstanding Contribution to Evolutionary Computation in Europe.

== Academic service ==
Ochoa has been associate editor and served on many editorial boards, including the IEEE Transactions on Evolutionary Computation, Evolutionary Computation journal and the journal of Genetic Programming and Evolvable Machines. She is on the Executive Board of Association for Computing Machinery (ACM) Special Interest Group on Genetic and Evolutionary Computation (SIGEVO).

== Selected publications ==
- Ochoa, Gabriela; Christie, Lee A.; Brownlee, Alexander E.; Hoyle, Andrew (2020) "Multi-objective evolutionary design of antibiotic treatments". Artificial Intelligence in Medicine. 102: 101759. doi:10.1016/j.artmed.2019.101759. ISSN 0933-3657
- Tinós, Renato; Whitley, Darrell; Ochoa, Gabriela (2020). "A New Generalized Partition Crossover for the Traveling Salesman Problem: Tunneling between Local Optima". Evolutionary Computation. 28 (2): 255–288. doi:10.1162/evco_a_00254. ISSN 1063-6560.
- Ochoa, Gabriela; Veerapen, Nadarajen (2018). "Mapping the global structure of TSP fitness landscapes". Journal of Heuristics. 24 (3): 265–294. doi:10.1007/s10732-017-9334-0. ISSN 1572-9397.
- Ochoa, Gabriela; Veerapen, Nadarajen (2016) "Deconstructing the Big Valley Search Space Hypothesis". Evolutionary Computation in Combinatorial Optimization. Lecture Notes in Computer Science. Cham: Springer International Publishing: 58–73. doi:10.1007/978-3-319-30698-8_5. ISBN 978-3-319-30698-8.
- Burke, Edmund K; Gendreau, Michel; Hyde, Matthew; Kendall, Graham; Ochoa, Gabriela; Özcan, Ender; Qu, Rong (2013-12-01). "Hyper-heuristics: a survey of the state of the art". Journal of the Operational Research Society. 64 (12): 1695–1724. doi:10.1057/jors.2013.71. ISSN 1476-9360. S2CID 3053192.
- Burke, Edmund K.; Hyde, Matthew; Kendall, Graham; Ochoa, Gabriela; Özcan, Ender; Woodward, John R. (2010), "A Classification of Hyper-heuristic Approaches", in Gendreau, Michel; Potvin, Jean-Yves (eds.), Handbook of Metaheuristics, International Series in Operations Research & Management Science, vol. 146, Boston, MA: Springer US, pp. 449–468, doi:10.1007/978-1-4419-1665-5_15, ISBN 978-1-4419-1665-5
- Burke, Edmund K.; Hyde, Mathew R.; Kendall, Graham; Ochoa, Gabriela; Ozcan, Ender; Woodward, John R. (2009), "Exploring Hyper-heuristic Methodologies with Genetic Programming", in Mumford, Christine L.; Jain, Lakhmi C. (eds.), Computational Intelligence: Collaboration, Fusion and Emergence, Intelligent Systems Reference Library, vol. 1, Berlin, Heidelberg: Springer, pp. 177–201, doi:10.1007/978-3-642-01799-5_6, ISBN 978-3-642-01799-5
- Ochoa, Gabriela; Tomassini, Marco; Vérel, Sebástien; Darabos, Christian (2008). "A study of NK landscapes' basins and local optima networks". Proceedings of the 10th annual conference on Genetic and evolutionary computation. GECCO '08. Atlanta, GA, USA: Association for Computing Machinery: 555–562. doi:10.1145/1389095.1389204. ISBN 978-1-60558-130-9.
- Ochoa, Gabriela (2006). "Error Thresholds in Genetic Algorithms". Evolutionary Computation. 14 (2): 157–182. doi:10.1162/evco.2006.14.2.157. ISSN 1063-6560.
- Ochoa, Gabriela (1998) "On Genetic Algorithms and Lindenmayer Systems". Parallel Problem Solving from Nature — PPSN V. Lecture Notes in Computer Science. Berlin, Heidelberg: Springer: 335–344. doi:10.1007/BFb0056876. ISBN 978-3-540-49672-4.
