= Bing Xue =

New Zealand computer scientist

Bing Xue FRSNZ
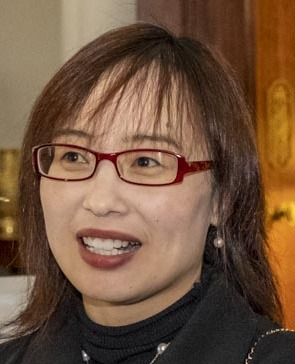
- Xue in 2023
- Awards: Fellow of the Institution of Professional Engineers New Zealand, Hingston

Academic background
- Education: Henan University of Economics and Law, Shenzhen University, Victoria University of Wellington
- Doctoral advisor: Mengjie Zhang, Will N. Browne

Bing Xue FRSNZ is a New Zealand computer scientist, and is a full professor at Victoria University of Wellington, specialising in machine learning, artificial intelligence and data visualisation.

== Academic career ==
Xue earned a Bachelor of Science degree from Henan University of Economics and Law in 2007 followed by a Master of Science from Shenzhen University in 2010. Xue completed a PhD titled Particle Swarm Optimisation for Feature Selection in Classification at Victoria University of Wellington in 2014. Her thesis supervisors were Will Browne and Mengjie Zhang. Xue then joined the faculty of the university, rising to full professor in 2022.

Bing co-led the first undergraduate and postgraduate qualifications in New Zealand on in artificial intelligence. She has been awarded two Marsden grants, Large-scale Evolutionary Feature Selection for Classification in 2016 and Evolutionary Automated Design of Deep Convolutional Neural Networks for Image Classification in 2019. The latter project aimed to improve the design of deep convolutional neural networks by using evolutionary computation-based approaches. Deep convolutional neural networks are used to interpret images in many situations, such as security, self-driving vehicles, and medicine. Improvements to their design would lead to better "classification accuracy, improved speed, simplicity, and interpretability".

She is on the editorial board of the Journal of the Royal Society of New Zealand.

== Awards and honours ==
Xue was made a Fellow of Engineering New Zealand in 2023. The citation noted her significant contributions to technical expertise applications and ICT engineering research, including the application of artificial intelligence in engineering. At this point in time Xue had published more than 300 refereed papers and accrued more than 10,000 citations.

In 2026 Xue was elected a Fellow of the Royal Society Te Apārangi.

== Selected works ==
- Xue, Bing; Mengjie Zhang; Will N. Browne; Yao, Xīn (2016). "A Survey on Evolutionary Computation Approaches to Feature Selection". IEEE Transactions on Evolutionary Computation. 20 (4): 606–626. doi:10.1109/tevc.2015.2504420. Wikidata Q116757849.
- Xue, Bing; Mengjie Zhang; Will N Browne (2013). "Particle swarm optimization for feature selection in classification: a multi-objective approach". IEEE Transactions on Cybernetics. 43 (6): 1656–1671. doi:10.1109/tsmcb.2012.2227469. PMID 24273143. Wikidata Q51138816.
- Yanan Sun; Xue, Bing; Mengjie Zhang; Gary G Yen; Jiancheng Lv (2020). "Automatically Designing CNN Architectures Using the Genetic Algorithm for Image Classification". IEEE Transactions on Cybernetics. arXiv:1808.03818. doi:10.1109/tcyb.2020.2983860. PMID 32324588. Wikidata Q93178235.
- Xue, Bing; Mengjie Zhang; Will N. Browne (2014). "Particle swarm optimisation for feature selection in classification: Novel initialisation and updating mechanisms". Applied Soft Computing. 18: 261–276. doi:10.1016/j.asoc.2013.09.018. Wikidata Q116757907.
- Yanan Sun; Xue, Bing; Mengjie Zhang; Gary G. Yen (2020). "Evolving Deep Convolutional Neural Networks for Image Classification". IEEE Transactions on Evolutionary Computation. 24 (2): 394–407. doi:10.1109/tevc.2019.2916183. Wikidata Q124073007.
- Yuqiao Liu; Yanan Sun; Xue, Bing; Mengjie Zhang; Gary G. Yen; Kay Chen Tan (2023). "A Survey on Evolutionary Neural Architecture Search". IEEE Transactions on Neural Networks and Learning Systems. 34 (2): 550–570. arXiv:2008.10937. doi:10.1109/tnnls.2021.3100554. PMID 34357870. Wikidata Q124072853.
- Emrah Hancer; Xue, Bing; Mengjie Zhang; Dervis Karaboga; Bahriye Akay (2018). "Pareto front feature selection based on artificial bee colony optimization". Information Sciences. 422: 462–479. doi:10.1016/j.ins.2017.09.028. Wikidata Q124073024.
