= The Symphonina Foundation =

Non-profit symphonic music foundation based in San Diego, California

The Symphonina Foundation is an American non-profit public benefit corporation based in San Diego, California, that promotes symphonic music to younger audiences worldwide through a shortened symphonic form known as the symphonina. Founded in 2020 by composer and artificial intelligence researcher David B. Fogel and music industry veteran Gary Gray, the foundation holds an annual composer competition, and records and promotes new works in this format, often in collaboration with the Budapest Scoring Orchestra or its own International Symphonina Orchestra.

== History ==
The Symphonina Foundation was incorporated in California as a non-profit public benefit corporation on February 10, 2020. It is recognized as a 501(c)(3) charitable organization in the United States. The organization is headquartered in La Jolla, California. The idea for the foundation grew out of concerns regarding the aging demographic of classical music audiences and the shrinking market share for classical music in global streaming services. Fogel developed the concept of a symphonina – a complete multi-movement symphonic work lasting approximately ten minutes – to adapt classical music to modern listening habits.

== Mission and aims ==
The foundation's mission is to "spread the joy of symphonic music to young audiences around the world". It aims to expand the reach of new symphonic works and adapt the format to shorter listening habits common on streaming platforms. The Foundation oversees several key programs aligned with its mission. The foundation promotes the symphonina format, releases an album of new symphonic music annually, holds an annual composer competition for the Best Symphonina of the Year, supports a virtual orchestra of players from around the world – the International Symphonina Orchestra – and produces the Symphonina Foundation podcast.

=== International Symphonina Orchestra ===
The International Symphonina Orchestra is a virtual, globally distributed ensemble that records new symphoninas remotely. Musicians from diverse countries contribute individual studio tracks, which are later mixed into complete orchestral performances. The orchestra comprises both young aspiring professionals and elite soloists or players from established symphonic orchestras.

=== Composition competitions ===
The foundation hosts an annual international composition competition to encourage new symphoninas (the Best Symphonina of the Year competition). Close to 100 works have been submitted globally, with winners receiving prize money along with professional studio recording and streaming distribution of their work.

=== Recordings and releases ===
The foundation's debut album, Introducing the Symphonina, was recognized by the World Entertainment Awards, Global Music Awards, and the Clouzine Independent Music Awards, and reached the top 10 on Billboard’s Traditional Classical Albums chart. Its follow-up album, Advent of the Symphonina, reached number one on the Billboard Traditional Classical chart on August 31, 2024. Ascension: Symphonina Rising, released in 2025, was recognized by the Hollywood Independent Music Awards, Clouzine, the LIT Music Awards, and the World Entertainment Awards. Ascension: Symphonina Rising was also a featured album on Wisconsin Public Radio (October, 2025). Daniel Fisher's Symphonina No. 2 from Ascension: Symphonina Rising won the Best Contemporary Classical Award at the Hollywood Independent Music Awards in July, 2025.

=== Educational and media activities ===
The Foundation maintains a digital library with podcasts, interviews, sheet music, and educational material. The organization also maintains active outreach through YouTube, Instagram, Facebook, and other social media.

== Reception and impact ==
Classical music media outlets have noted the symphonina format as a novel adaptation to streaming-era consumption habits. Ludwig Van Toronto (2024) and Wisconsin Public Radio (2024) profiled the Foundation’s work and its impact on younger listeners in particular. JWVibe (2025) wrote that symphoninas are “… a genius, transformational idea whose time has come.” The Symphonina Foundation received the 600KOGO News Radio George Chamberlin Community Leadership Award along with a $1000 donation (2025).
