= Una-May O'Reilly =

American computer scientist

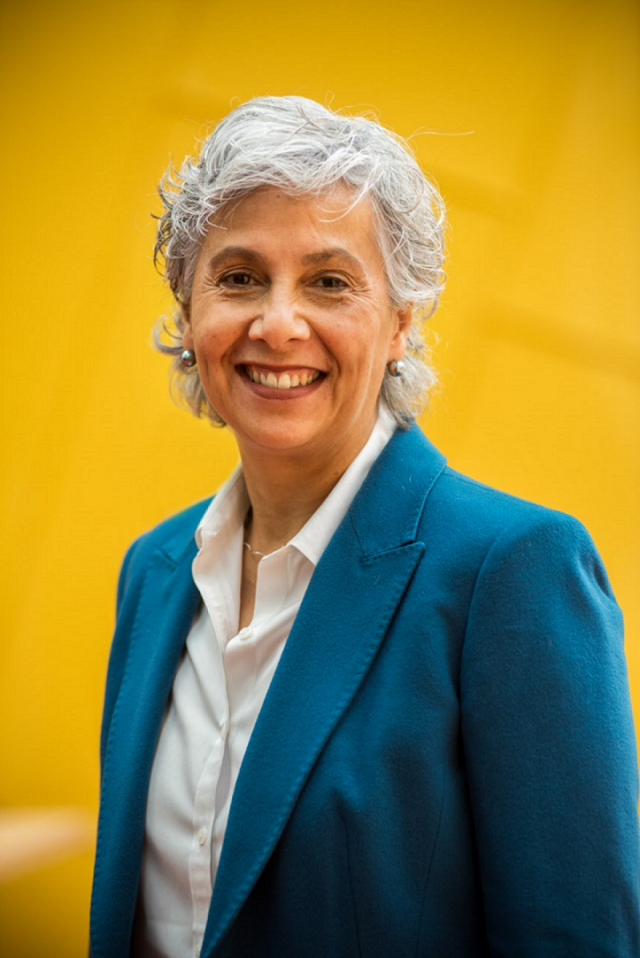
- Education: University of Calgary; Carleton University
- Awards: EvoStar Award for Outstanding Contribution to Evolutionary Computation
- Scientific career
- Workplaces: Massachusetts Institute of Technology
- Thesis: An analysis of genetic programming (1996)

Una-May O'Reilly is an American-Canadian computer scientist and leader of the Anyscale Learning For All (ALFA) group at the MIT Computer Science and Artificial Intelligence Laboratory.

== Early life and education ==
O'Reilly earned her undergraduate degree at the University of Calgary. She was a graduate student at the Carleton University, where she studied computer science. During her doctorate O'Reilly worked as a graduate fellow at the Santa Fe Institute. Her dissertation was one of the first to explore genetic programming. She was awarded a Doctor of Law (honoris causa) degree from Dalhousie University, Canada, and addressed the graduating Computer Science class of 2024. She joined the MIT Computer Science and Artificial Intelligence Laboratory as a postdoctoral fellow in 1996.

== Research and career ==
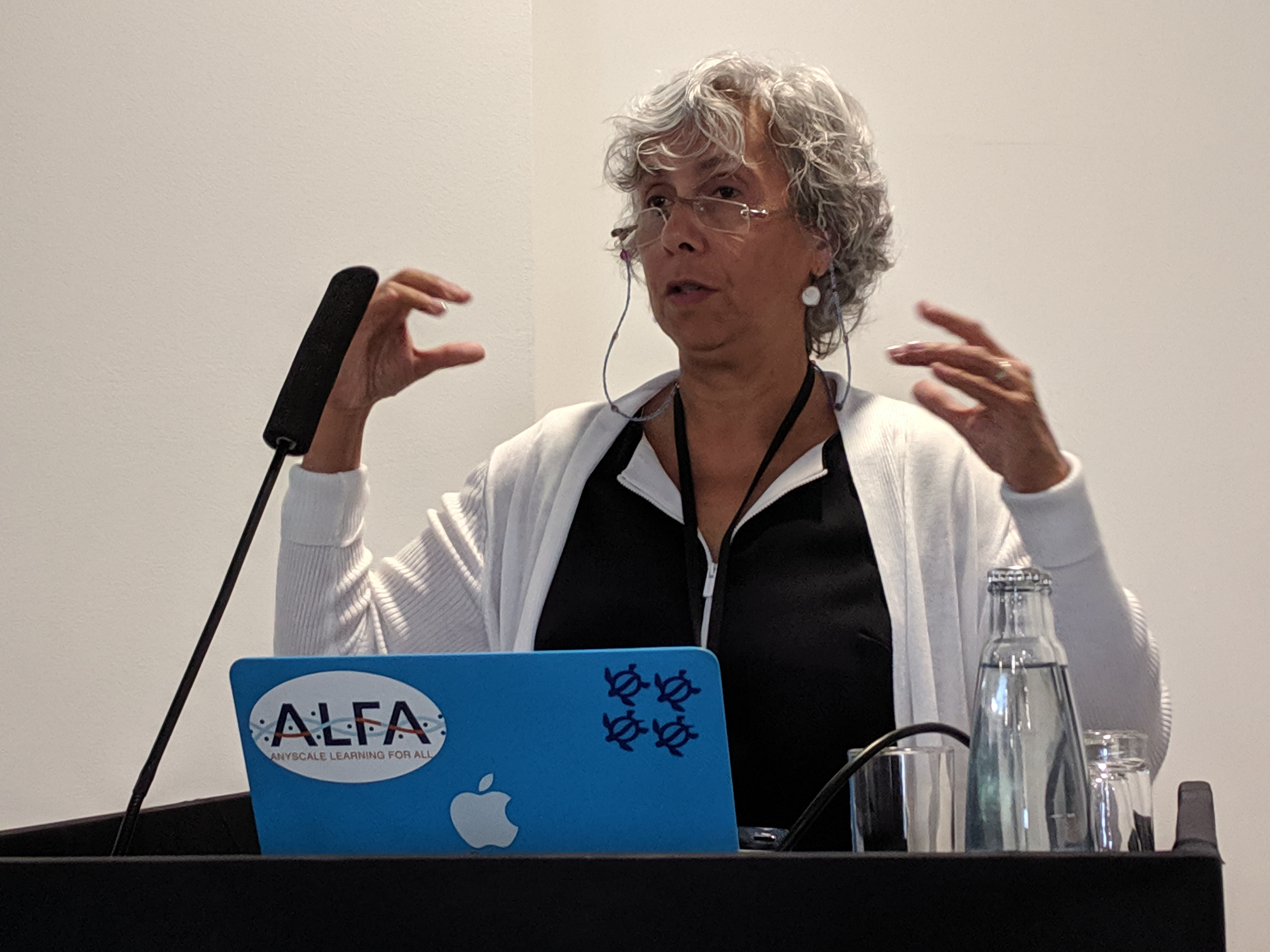
O'Reilly at the SecDef Workshop, held as part of GECCO 2019

O'Reilly is a senior research scientist at the MIT Computer Science and Artificial Intelligence Laboratory, where she leads a team focusing on machine learning and evolutionary algorithms for Artificial Adversarial Intelligence. The vision of her research group, Anyscale Learning For All (ALFA), is to computationally replicate Adversarial Intelligence. Her goal is to reveal new insights into the nature of Adversarial Intelligence and Adversarial Behavior, including questions like: How can it be used to strengthen defenses? How can it be used to anticipate what an adversary may do? How and why does it continue or cease? How does it lead to escalation? She consequently studies regulatory compliance, information security, and cyber security.

Prior ALFA research topics include intelligent data analytics and the modelling of medical data. O'Reilly has designed computational models for a variety of different problems, including calculating the financial risk of renewable energy investments and creating a flavor algorithm that replaces taste testers. O'Reilly has developed statistical models to inform the design of renewable energy systems, including predicting wind speed.

In 2013 she was awarded the EvoStar award for Outstanding Contribution to Evolutionary Computation in Europe. O'Reilly has received other various awards and honours for her work in genetic programming, including being elected to multiple terms serving on the executive board of the ACM Special Interest Group on Genetic and Evolutionary Computation, SIGevo (formerly International Society of Genetic and Evolutionary Computation).

== Select publications ==
- Kinnear, Kenneth E.; Langdon, William B.; Spector, Lee; Angeline, Peter J.; O'Reilly, Una-May (1994). Advances in Genetic Programming. MIT Press. ISBN 978-0-262-19423-5.
- Ansel, Jason; Kamil, Shoaib; Veeramachaneni, Kalyan; Ragan-Kelley, Jonathan; Bosboom, Jeffrey; O'Reilly, Una-May; Amarasinghe, Saman (2014). "OpenTuner". Proceedings of the 23rd international conference on Parallel architectures and compilation. New York, New York, USA: ACM Press. pp. 303–316. doi:10.1145/2628071.2628092. ISBN 978-1-4503-2809-8.
- Poli, Riccardo, 1961- (2008). A field guide to genetic programming. Langdon, W. B. (William B.), McPhee, Nicholas F., Koza, John R. [S.I.]: [Lulu Press], lulu.com. ISBN 978-1-4092-0073-4. OCLC 225855345.
- Stephenson, Mark; Amarasinghe, Saman; Martin, Martin; O'Reilly, Una-May (2003-05-09). "Meta optimization: improving compiler heuristics with machine learning". ACM SIGPLAN Notices. 38 (5): 77–90. doi:10.1145/780822.781141. ISSN 0362-1340.
