= Henan University of Economics and Law =

Public university in Zhengzhou, Henan, China

The Henan University of Economics and Law (Chinese: 河南财经政法大学; lit. 'Henan University of Finance', 'Economics', 'Political Science and Law') is a provincial public university located in Zhengzhou. Henan, China.

The university was formed by a merge between Henan Finance and Economics College (河南财经学院) and Henan Political and Legal Management Cadre College (河南省政法管理干部学院) in March 2010. It is accredited by the Ministry of Education of China.

As of August 2016, the university has 3 campuses: the North, South, and Zheng Dong, which together cover an area of more than 2,000 acres. The school has various teaching laboratories, a library collection of c. 2,600,000 volumes, a stadium, and other basic facilities. A total of 24 yuan (departments) offer 59 undergraduate degrees.

The school hosts more than 28,000 full-time students. Staff totals more than 1,900, including over 1,500 full-time teachers, more than 700 of whom have senior professional titles. A total of 370 professors have doctoral degrees, and 843 more have master's degrees.
