= Inman Harvey =

British computer scientist (died 2026)

Inman Harvey (died 5 June 2026) was a British computer scientist and academic who was a senior lecturer in computer science and artificial intelligence at the University of Sussex; he later was a visiting senior research fellow at the same university. His research interests largely centered on the development of artificial evolution as an approach to the design of complex systems. Application domains of interest included evolutionary robotics, evolvable hardware, molecules for pharmaceutical purposes.

Together with other Sussex faculty, mainly from the School of Cognitive and Computer Sciences (COGS), he developed the MSc programme on Evolutionary and Adaptive Systems (EASy), which was active in the 1990s and 2000s, attracting dozens of students that have contributed to artificial life, evolutionary robotics, cognitive science and other disciplines.

Harvey's other interests included philosophical approaches to AI and artificial life (a non-representational, dynamical systems approach); passive dynamic walking; and Gaia theory. He originally started as a mathematician and philosopher at the University of Cambridge.

The article "Evolving a Conscious Machine" in the June 1998 issue of the magazine Discover (pp. 72–79) overviews Harvey's and Adrian Thompson's work with evolving an FPGA program to recognize tones. See:

Harvey died on 5 June 2026.

== Selected publications ==
Harvey's highest-cited papers indexed at Google Scholar are:

- N. Jakobi, P. Husbands, I. Harvey (1995). Noise and the reality gap: The use of simulation in evolutionary robotics. Advances in Artificial Life: Third European Conference on Artificial Life
- D. Cliff, P. Husbands, I. Harvey (1993). Explorations in evolutionary robotics. Adaptive Behavior 2 (1): 73–110
- I. Harvey, P. Husbands, D. Cliff, A. Thompson, N. Jakobi (1997). Evolutionary robotics: the Sussex approach. Robotics and Autonomous Systems 20 (2–4), 205–24
