= Susan Stepney =

British computer scientist

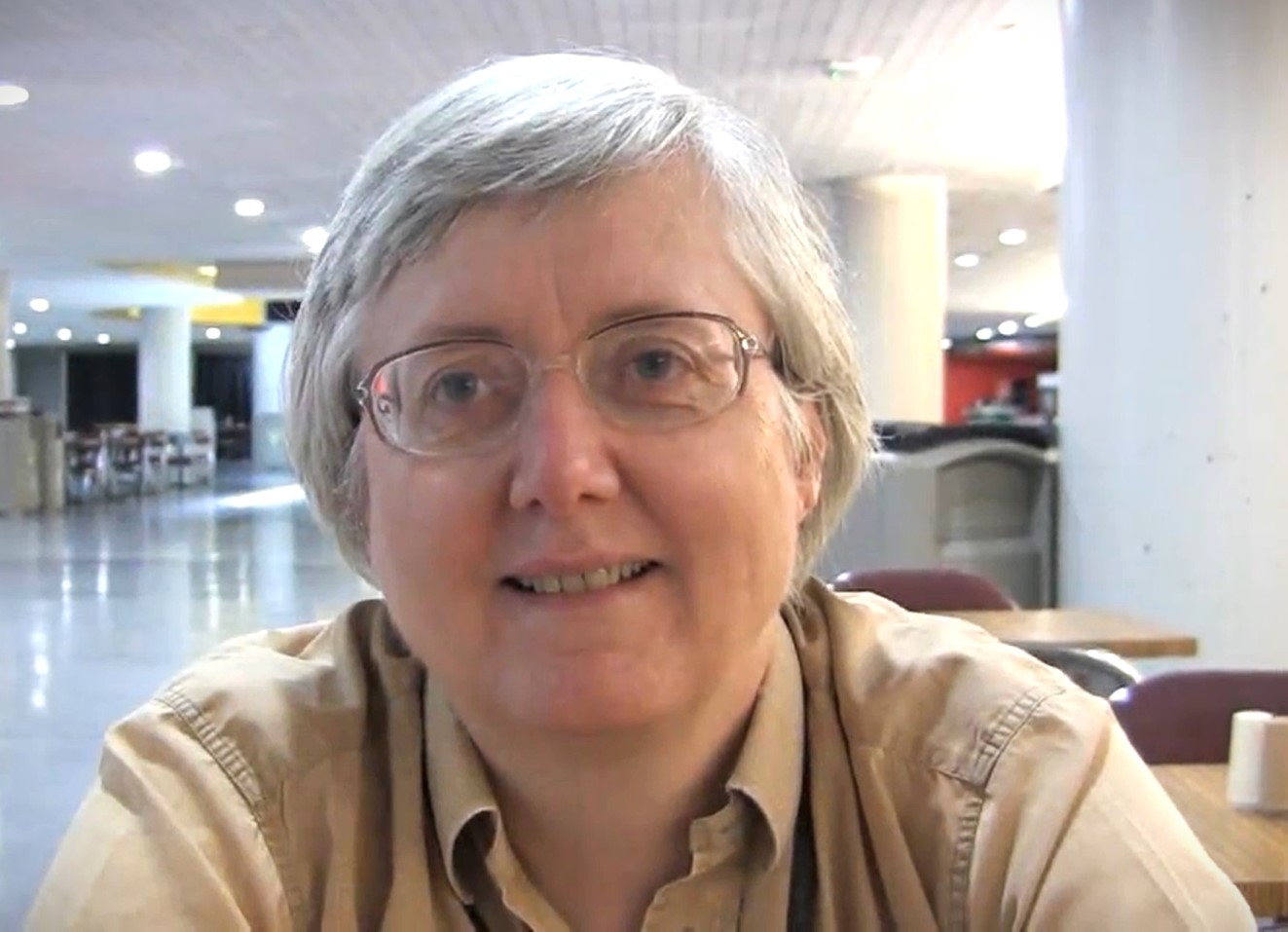
- Stepney in 2014
- Born: 1958 (age 67–68)
- Education: University of Cambridge
- Scientific career
- Workplaces: Logica; Marconi Research Centre; University of York
- Thesis: Relativistic thermal plasmas (1983)
- Doctoral advisor: Martin Rees

Susan Stepney (born 1958) is a British computer scientist who is a professor at the University of York. Her research considers non-standard computing and bio-inspired algorithms. She was previously at Logica and Marconi Research Centre, where she developed new programming languages and computational models.

== Early life and education ==
Stepney became interested in science and science fiction at a young age. She completed her undergraduate and graduate degree at the University of Cambridge, where she studied theoretical physics and Part III of the Mathematical Tripos. Her doctoral research involved using analytical mathematics and Fortran to understand relativistic astrophysics plasmas. She was a postdoctoral researcher at the University of Cambridge. She left academia to join industry, moving to join the Marconi Research Centre, where she worked with Transputers and Occam on a Parallel Simulation Facility. She designed and implemented a tool for Graphical Representation of Activity, Interconnection and Loading. She used the Z specification language to develop a framework for an access control system that allowed users from multiple administrators to communicate whilst the administrators retained network-wide control. She animated the access control system in Prolog.

== Research and career ==
Stepney moved to Logica in 1989, where she spent thirteen years working on mathematical modelling of computing systems and specialising in the Z notation. She worked on a high integrity compiler for high integrity applications, which became known as DeCCo. Stepney's DeCCo compiler was deployed on processors at Qinetiq and Atomic Weapons Establishment. She developed a formal language tool for Logica using Smalltalk.

In 2002, Stepney joined the University of York, where she worked on unconventional computing. She has worked on physical computation and the programming requirements for unconventional requirements. She has developed computer simulations of complex systems, including pioneering evolutionary algorithms for biological and chemical processes.

== Selected publications ==
- Dominic Horsman; Susan Stepney; Rob C Wagner; Viv Kendon (1 September 2014). "When does a physical system compute?". Proceedings of the Royal Society A. 470 (2169) 20140182. arXiv:1309.7979. doi:10.1098/rspa.2014.0182. ISSN 0962-8444. PMC 4123767. PMID 25197245. Zbl 1353.68077. Wikidata Q51041788.
- Stepney, S.; Guilbert, P. W. (1983-10-01). "Numerical fits to important rates in high temperature astrophysical plasmas". Monthly Notices of the Royal Astronomical Society. 204 (4): 1269–1277. doi:10.1093/mnras/204.4.1269. ISSN 0035-8711.
- Clark, John A.; Jacob, Jeremy L.; Stepney, Susan (2005-09-01). "The design of S-boxes by simulated annealing". New Generation Computing. 23 (3): 219–231. doi:10.1007/BF03037656. ISSN 1882-7055.
