= Rong Qu =

Chinese-British computer scientist

Rong Qu is a Chinese and British computer scientist whose research focuses on hyper-heuristics, the application of machine learning in choosing among multiple heuristic solutions to computational search problems, especially as applied to problems in scheduling, portfolio optimisation, and vehicle routing. She is a professor of computer science at the University of Nottingham.

== Education and career ==
Qu received a bachelor's degree with honours in computer science from Xidian University in 1996. She came to the UK for graduate study at the University of Nottingham, where she completed her Ph.D. in 2002. Her dissertation, Case-Based Reasoning for Course Timetabling Problems, was supervised by Edmund K. Burke.

She stayed at the University of Nottingham for postdoctoral research from 2001 to 2005, and then as a lecturer beginning in 2005. She was promoted to associate professor in 2013 and to professor in 2023.

== Books ==
Qu is a coauthor, with Nelishia Pillay, of the books Hyper-Heuristics: Theory and Applications (Springer, 2018) and Advances in Hyper-Heuristics (Springer, 2025). She and Pillay are co-editors of Automated Design of Machine Learning and Search Algorithms (Springer, 2021).

== Recognition ==
Qu was named to the 2026 class of IEEE Fellows, "for contributions to automated evolutionary algorithms in combinatorial optimisation".
