= David B. Fogel =

American computer scientist

- Born: February 2, 1964 (age 62)
- Education: University of California, San Diego (Ph.D. in Engineering)
- Known for: Evolutionary computation, Blondie24 and Blondie25 AI programs, evolutionary algorithms, AI applications in various industries
- Notable work: Blondie24 (checkers), Blondie25 (chess), evolutionary algorithms in AI applications
- Awards: IEEE Fellow (2008), Honorary Doctorate (University of Pretoria, 2008), Evolutionary Computation Pioneer Award (2008), IEEE Kiyo Tomiyasu Award (2004), Computational Intelligence Pioneer Award (2003)
- Scientific career
- Fields: Evolutionary computation, artificial intelligence, neural networks
- Workplaces: Trials.ai, Natural Selection, Inc., Color Butler, Inc., Effect Technologies, Inc.

David B. Fogel (born February 2, 1964) is a pioneer in evolutionary computation.

Fogel received his Ph.D. in engineering from the University of California, San Diego in 1992. He is currently Chief Scientist at Trials.ai, and holds other founding positions at Natural Selection, Inc., Color Butler, Inc., and Effect Technologies, Inc., the maker of the patented EffectCheck sentiment analysis software tool. He has advised several AI companies in the areas of B2B lead generation, logistics, and employee retention, as well as other areas.

He received an honorary doctorate for his artificial intelligence research project, Blondie24, in which a deep learning adversarial neural network evolved itself into an expert checkers player. In further research, Fogel's Blondie25 evolutionary chess playing program earned wins over Fritz 8 (the fifth-ranked computer chess program in the world at the time) and was the first machine learning chess program to defeat a nationally ranked human master (James Quon).

Fogel co-founded Natural Selection, Inc. in 1993, and has worked on numerous successful applications of artificial intelligence. He served as Natural Selection, Inc.'s lead consultant for Agouron Pharmaceuticals' AGDOCK (formerly EPDOCK) protein-ligand docking software (1993-1998), was principal investigator on evolutionary neural networks for breast cancer detection (1995-2000), cybersecurity for a federal agency (early 2000s), and lead program manager for Natural Selection, Inc.'s machine learning system for screening food imports for the Food and Drug Administration (FDA) (2003-2008). The latter development was fielded nationwide as part of the FDA's PREDICT screening system and Natural Selection, Inc. received an honor award from the FDA in 2010 for its efforts. The IEEE Computational Intelligence Society recognized Natural Selection, Inc. with its inaugural Outstanding Organization Award in 2011. Fogel also led the development of evolutionary systematic market trading algorithms that were the foundation of Natural Selection Financial, Inc. (NSFIN), a registered investment advisor company, formed in 2006. NSFIN's intellectual property was acquired in 2008 by a hedge fund group.

Fogel's publications have been cited over 30,000 times. His h-index of 63 places him in the top 250 of computer scientists all time by that metric.

Fogel founded the Evolutionary Programming Society in 1991 and served as the founding chairman of the Evolutionary Programming Conference in 1992. He served as chairman again in 1993. The conference ran through 1998, with proceedings published by World Scientific, MIT Press, and Springer, whereupon it merged with the IEEE Conference on Evolutionary Computation and the IEE GALESIA conference to become the Congress on Evolutionary Computation, first held in 1999. (This later became the IEEE Congress on Evolutionary Computation.) In 1996, he was appointed the founding editor-in-chief of the IEEE Transactions on Evolutionary Computation, Following the passing of Prof. Michael Conrad, Fogel became the editor-in-chief of BioSystems in 2000. He also served as general chairman for the 2002 IEEE World Congress on Computational Intelligence. and founded the IEEE Computational Intelligence Society's Symposium Series on Computational Intelligence in 2007. He is the author of 9 books and over 200 publications in evolutionary computing and neural networks. Fogel was president of the IEEE Computational Intelligence Society in 2008–2009. Fogel has given hundreds of public lectures at conferences, museums, and for corporate events regarding diverse aspects of AI, including the prospects of how it will be used to benefit humanity in the future.

In 2017, David Fogel began curating AI, science, and technology news on his website.

== Scientific honors ==
- 2003 – Computational Intelligence Pioneer Award, SPIE
- 2004 – IEEE Kiyo Tomiyasu Award
- 2008 – IEEE Fellow
- 2008 – Evolutionary Computation Pioneer Award, IEEE Computational Intelligence Society
- 2008 – Honorary doctorate, University of Pretoria, South Africa
- 2009 – Top 100 most influential alumni from UC San Diego
- 2012 – CajAstur Prize in Soft Computing
- 2019 – Top 100 AI Researchers in Drug Design and Advanced Healthcare

== Music ==
David Fogel is also an award-winning composer, creating the original orchestral score for Path of Totality: Eclipse 2017 (Music: David Fogel, Cinematography: Joe Woolbright, Sound Engineering: Gary Gray, Peter Sprague, and David Fogel), which received a 2018 Telly Award for Use of Music. Fogel released his first jazz EP, "Brighter Nights," on Spotify and other streaming services in 2018. In 2019, Fogel composed the score for Dream of a Childhood Sun, collaborating with Gary Gray (producer), which featured NASA footage of the sun and played in planetariums in the US, receiving a 2019 Telly Award for Use of Music as well as a Davey Award. He also released his first jazz LP, "Back in the Groove," on major streaming services in August 2019. Fogel created a new form of symphonic composition called a "Symphonina," a complete multi-movement symphony performed in about 10 minutes and co-founded the non-profit The Symphonina Foundation with Gary Gray to promote symphonic music to younger audiences. Several of his symphonic compositions are available streaming online.
