= Stefano Nolfi =

Stefano Nolfi (born 23 September 1963, Rome) is a director of research of the Institute of Cognitive Sciences and Technologies at the Consiglio Nazionale delle Ricerche and head of the Laboratory of Autonomous Robots and Artificial Life. He is one of the founders of Evolutionary robotics (see his book published by MIT Press in 2000). Nolfi's research interests include: evolution of communication and language, language and action, adaptive behavior, swarm robotics.

Stefano Nolfi's team at Institute is researching a new approach in developing artificial intelligence in relation to language.

An overview of his work is included in

Nolfi received his laurea (master's) degree in literature and philosophy from the University of Rome La Sapienza in 1986.
