= Evolutionary art =

Art generated by an iterated process

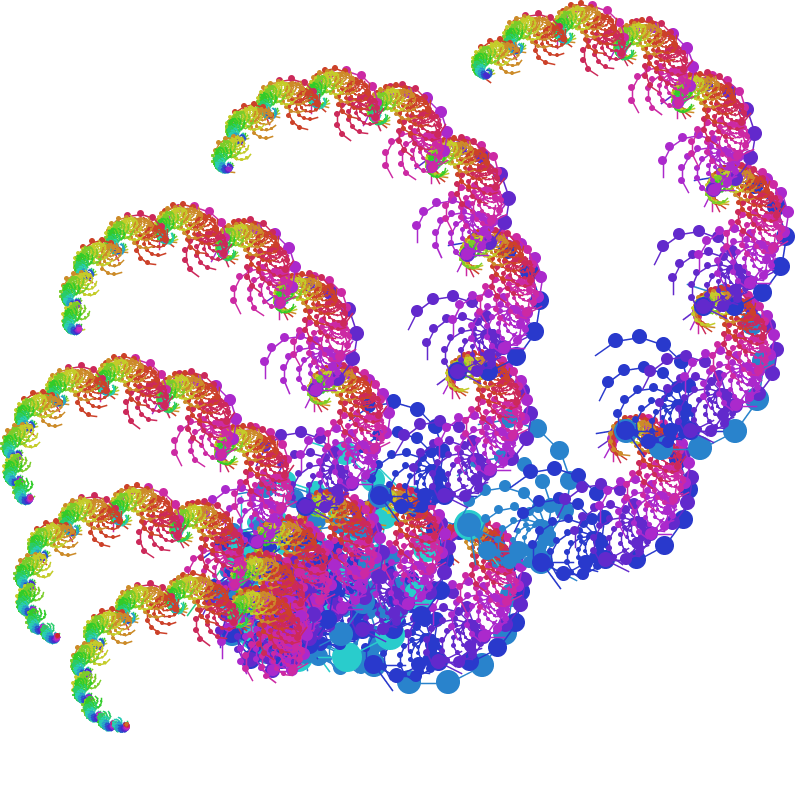
An image generated using an evolutionary algorithm

Evolutionary art is a branch of generative art, in which the artist does not do the work of constructing the artwork, but rather lets a system do the construction. In evolutionary art, initially generated art is put through an iterated process of selection and modification to arrive at a final product, where it is the artist who is the selective agent.

Evolutionary art is to be distinguished from BioArt, which uses living organisms as the material medium instead of paint, stone, metal, etc.

== Overview ==
In common with biological evolution through natural selection or animal husbandry, the members of a population undergoing artificial evolution modify their form or behavior over many reproductive generations in response to a selective regime.

In interactive evolution the selective regime may be applied by the viewer explicitly by selecting individuals which are aesthetically pleasing. Alternatively a selection pressure can be generated implicitly, for example according to the length of time a viewer spends near a piece of evolving art.

Equally, evolution may be employed as a mechanism for generating a dynamic world of adaptive individuals, in which the selection pressure is imposed by the program, and the viewer plays no role in selection, as in the Black Shoals project.

== See also ==
- Digital morphogenesis
- Electric Sheep
- Evolutionary music
- NEAT Particles
- Universal Darwinism
