= IEEE Transactions on Evolutionary Computation =

- Discipline: evolutionary and natural computation
- Language: English
- Edited by: Carlos A. Coello Coello

Publication details
- History: 1997–present
- Publisher: IEEE Computational Intelligence Society
- Frequency: Bimonthly
- Impact factor: 16.497 (2021)

Standard abbreviations
- ISO 4: IEEE Trans. Evol. Comput.

Indexing
- CODEN: ITEVF5
- ISSN: 1089-778X (print); 1941-0026 (web)
- LCCN: 97648327
- OCLC no.: 35127428

Links
- Journal homepage; Online access

IEEE Transactions on Evolutionary Computation is a bimonthly peer-reviewed scientific journal published by the IEEE Computational Intelligence Society. It covers evolutionary computation and related areas including nature-inspired algorithms, population-based methods, and optimization where selection and variation are integral, and hybrid systems where these paradigms are combined. The editor-in-chief is Carlos A. Coello Coello (CINVESTAV). According to the Journal Citation Reports, the journal has a 2021 impact factor of 16.497.

The journal was established in 1997 by the IEEE Neural Networks Council, with David B. Fogel as founding editor-in-chief (1997-2002). Other editors-in-chief have included Xin Yao (2003-2008), Garrison Greenwood (2009-2014) and Kay Chen Tan (2015-2020).
