= Galactic Arms Race =

2010 video game

- Galactic Arms Race logo.
- Developer(s): Evolutionary Games
- Platform(s): Windows
- Release: 2010,2012
- Genre(s): Shooter
- Mode(s): Single-player, multiplayer

Galactic Arms Race (GAR) is a space shooter video game first released in 2010 by American studio Evolutionary Games in association with the Evolutionary Complexity Research Group at UCF (EPlex).

== Gameplay ==
Galactic Arms Race screenshot.

GAR is a hybrid space shooter and Action RPG with single player, co-op, and PVP on dedicated servers for up to 32 players. Players fly a space ship, destroy enemies, earn money and experience, gain levels, find items, and upgrade their ships. The main feature that differentiates GAR from other space shooters is a procedural content generation (PCG) system that produces unique particle system weapons. The game attempts to create weapons that players will like based on usage statistics of existing weapons using a custom version of the NEAT evolutionary algorithm. GAR is one of the earliest video games to incorporate procedural content generation that is automatically and implicitly driven by player choice.

== Platforms ==
The game runs on Windows only because it uses the Microsoft XNA framework for graphics and sound. Initial versions were released for free in 2010. A commercial version became available via Steam and Desura in 2012. Currently the developers are redoing their UI as the Microsoft XNA platform was killed off by Microsoft. The developers will likely change over to MonoGame which is an open source implementation of XNA.

== Reception and awards ==
Galactic Arms Race was a finalist in the 2010 Indie Game Challenge. A paper detailing the game's weapon evolution algorithm won the Best Paper Award at the IEEE Conference on Computational Intelligence and Games. An early version of the game won an Editor's Choice Award on AiGameDev.com.
