= Nelishia Pillay =

South African computer scientist

Nelishia Pillay is a computer scientist at the University of Pretoria in South Africa, where she is a professor in the Department of Computer Science and holds the NRF/DSI SARChI Chair in Artificial Intelligence for Sustainable Development and the Multichoice Joint Chair in Machine Learning. Her research concerns hyper-heuristics, the application of machine learning in choosing among multiple heuristic solutions to computational search problems, and the use of genetic programming and bio-inspired computing for these problems.

== Education and career ==
Pillay is originally from Pietermaritzburg in South Africa. As a high school student she shifted her career goals from mathematics education to computer science, inspired by her father's business magazine. Although she studied computer science as an undergraduate at the University of Natal in Pietermaritzburg, she ended up receiving a bachelor's degree with honours in applied mathematics, before returning to computer science for a master's degree there. In 1998 she became a lecturer in computer science at the Durban campus of the University of Natal while completing her Ph.D. in artificial intelligence. In 2004, she returned to the Pietermaritzburg campus as senior lecturer, later becoming department head. In 2017 she moved to the University of Pretoria, again as department head.

== Books ==
Pillay is a coauthor, with Rong Qu of the University of Nottingham, of the books Hyper-Heuristics: Theory and Applications (Springer, 2018) and Advances in Hyper-Heuristics (Springer, 2025). She and Qu are co-editors of Automated Design of Machine Learning and Search Algorithms (Springer, 2021).
