= Risto Miikkulainen =

Finnish-American computer scientist

Risto Miikkulainen (born 16 December 1961) is a Finnish-American computer scientist and professor at the University of Texas at Austin. He is also an VP of AI Research at Cognizant AI Lab. In 2023, he was elected an AAAI Fellow "for significant contribution to neuroevolution techniques and applications", and in 2016, named Fellow of the Institute of Electrical and Electronics Engineers (IEEE) "for contributions to techniques and applications for neural and evolutionary computation". He was elevated to the College of Fellows of the International Neural Network Society in 2024. Born in Helsinki, Finland, Miikkulainen has lived in the United States since 1986.
