= List of crowdsourcing projects =

Below is a list of projects that rely on crowdsourcing. See also open innovation.

== A ==
- Adaptive Vehicle Make was a project overseen by DARPA to crowdsource the design and manufacture of a new armored vehicle.
- Air Quality Eggs by WickedDevices are open-source hardware Internet of Things pollution monitors that facilitate citizen crowdsourcing of air quality readings
- Amara is a website that enables crowdsourced translations of videos from a variety of popular video hosting websites. The subtitles created are used to make online video content accessible to a wider audience, including the deaf and hard of hearing, and those who cannot understand the language of the source.
- Amazon Mechanical Turk, a platform on which crowdsourcing tasks called "HITs" (Human Intelligence Tasks") can be created and publicized and people can execute the tasks and be paid for doing so. Dubbed "Artificial Artificial Intelligence", it was named after The Turk, an 18th-century chess-playing "machine".
- The first crowdsourced documentary film is the non-profit The American Revolution, which went into production in 2005, and which examines the role media played in the cultural, social and political changes from 1968 to 1974 through the story of underground, free-form radio station WBCN-FM in Boston. When the project began, by seeking archival contributions from the public, the term "crowdsource" was not in use, and so the film was referred to as the "first open source documentary film". The film is being produced by Lichtenstein Creative Media and the non-profit Filmmakers Collaborative.
- Arrange to Settle is an Indian-American film funded through crowdsourcing platforms.
- Article One Partners, founded in 2008, is a community of technology experts who execute crowdsourced prior art search by researching and contributing information related to patents. By submitting research to the online platform, the community members compete for cash rewards, ranging from $5,000 to $50,000.

== B ==
- Berkeley Open System for Skill Aggregation (BOSSA), by analogy with the volunteer computing project Berkeley Open Infrastructure for Network Computing (BOINC)
- Any software project with an open Beta test.
- The Netherlands-based investigative journalism group Bellingcat that specialises in fact-checking and open-source intelligence. Bellingcat operate a Discord server of more than 10 000 members with many volunteers among them participating in investigative tasks.
- Beyond Words was a crowdsourcing project created at the Library of Congress in 2017 using the open source codebase Scribe, created by Zooniverse and New York Public Library. It asked volunteers to identify cartoons and photographs in the Chronicling America historic newspaper collections. The purpose was partly to improve research based on these collections.
- BlueServo was a free website, which crowdsourced surveillance of the Texas–Mexico border through live camera streaming over the Internet. This evolved from an initiative taken by the State of Texas, which announced it would install 200 mobile cameras along the Texas–Mexico border, that would enable anyone with an internet connection to watch the border and report sightings of alleged illegal immigrants to border patrol agents. It was later shut down due to lack of funding.
- Britain in a Day is a Ridley Scott film, a successor project to Life in a Day, and part of the BBC's Cultural Olympiad, in which people in Britain filmed themselves on 12 November 2011, and submitted video clips online for inclusion in the film.
- By the People is a transcription and tagging crowdsourcing project from the Library of Congress. It launched on 24 October 2018. Volunteers can participate anonymously or by making an account. Signed in volunteers can edit other people's transcriptions. Materials are broken into "Campaigns" such as "Letters to Lincoln". "Rosa Parks: In her own words". and "Anna E. Dickinson Papers". Transcriptions are published on the Library of Congress main website, and are available for bulk download once a Campaign is complete.

== C ==
- California Digital Newspaper Collection In August 2011, the California Digital Newspaper Collection implemented crowdsourced OCR text correction of its digitized historical newspapers; some published as early as 1846 (California statehood 1850). CDNC is a project of the Center for Bibliographical Studies and Research (CBSR) at the University of California, Riverside. The CDNC is supported in part by the U.S. Institute of Museum and Library Services under the provisions of the Library Services and Technology Act, administered in California by the State Librarian.
- Historic Cambridge Newspaper Collection. In March 2011, the Cambridge Public Library in Cambridge, Massachusetts, launched a digital collection of historic newspapers that implements crowdsourced OCR text correction. The freely accessible and keyword searchable database contains newspapers dating back to 1846 when Cambridge was established as a city. The Historic Cambridge Newspaper Collection is a project of the Cambridge Room, the Cambridge Public Library's Archives and Special Collections, and is supported by funding from the Community Preservation Act.
- Chicago History Museum on 14 October 2013, announced a project asking the public to furnish ideas for a future exhibition and reducing the most-often-submitted ideas to one assignment through a series of public votes. According to the American Alliance of Museums, this is the first crowdsourcing project allowing the public to give an exhibition assignment to an American museum.
- Citizen Archivist is a crowdsourcing transcription project at the National Archives of the United States. Volunteers can transcribe and tag any digitized content in the National Archives' online holdings. Volunteer coordinators curate "Missions" to help volunteers choose materials that interest them.
- CitySourced is an enterprise civic engagement platform. CitySourced provides a mobile app for citizens to identify and report non-emergency civic issues, such as public works, quality of life, and environmental issues. The service is part of the e-Government or gov 2.0 movement, which aims to connect government and citizens through the use of technology.
- Cisco Systems Inc. held an I-Prize contest in which teams using collaborative technologies created innovative business plans. The winners in 2008 were a three-person team, Anna Gossen from Munich, her husband Niels Gossen, and her brother Sergey Bessonnitsyn, that created a business plan demonstrating how IP technology could be used to increase energy efficiency. More than 2,500 people from 104 countries entered the competition. The winning team won US$250,000.
- Clickworkers – experimental NASA site
- Crowdin is a localization management platform for mobile apps, web, desktop software and related assets. Reddit, Khan Academy, Minecraft and other used the platform to crowdsource localization.
- CrowdFlower was founded in 2007 to manage internet crowdsourcing. It is currently the largest provider of crowdsourcing solutions for enterprise with over 450 million tasks completed and 2 million contributors.
- CrowdMed is a healthcare crowdsourcing platform based in San Francisco, California.
- Crowdspring is a marketplaces for crowdsourced creative services.

== D ==
- The 2007 DARPA Urban Challenge focused on autonomous vehicles, requiring participating teams to create an autonomous vehicle that was able to successfully navigate traffic as well as complex maneuvers including merging, passing, and parking. To successfully complete the challenge, participating vehicles needed to complete a 60-mile course in less than six hours.
- Dell IdeaStorm is a website launched by Dell on 16 February 2007 to allow Dell "to gauge which ideas are most important and most relevant to" the public.
- The Democratic National Committee launched FlipperTV in November 2007 and McCainpedia in May 2008 to crowdsource video gathered by Democratic trackers and research compiled by DNC staff in the hands of the public to do with as they chose.
- The Daily Minor Planet is the Catalina Sky Survey's NASA-funded citizen science project focused on finding and tracking near earth asteroids, allowing volunteers to scan through nightly archival images from the 1.5 meter survey telescope at Mount Lemmon Observatory to discover new Asteroids.
- DesignCrowd, a crowdsourcing marketplace for graphic design and creative services, launched in February 2008 and helped run a contest for global footwear company HI-TEC. HI-TEC "estimated that using DesignCrowd.com [and crowdsourcing] for the project saved HI-TEC up to half the costs of going down the usual design route". DesignCrowd purchased Brandstack and formed BrandCrowd On 20 December 2011.
- LEGO Design byME was a service connected with the construction toy Lego. Launched in 2005 under the name Lego Factory, the service allowed people to design their own Lego models using a computer program, then upload them to the Lego website, design their own box design, and order them for actual delivery. The brand also covers a small selection of products that have been designed by Lego fans, and which were available to purchase as a set.
- The search for aviator Steve Fossett, whose plane went missing in Nevada in 2007, in which up to 50,000 people examined high-resolution satellite imagery from DigitalGlobe that was made available via Amazon Mechanical Turk. The search was ultimately unsuccessful. Fosset's remains were eventually located by more traditional means. DigitalGlobe satellite imagery had previously been posted to Amazon Mechanical Turk after the disappearance of computer scientist Jim Gray at sea in January 2007, an effort that had attracted much media attention, but not provided any new clues.
- Distributed Proofreaders (commonly abbreviated as DP or PGDP) is a Web-based project founded in 2000 by Charles Franks that supports the development of e-texts for Project Gutenberg by allowing many people to work together in proofreading drafts of e-texts for errors. As of October 2011, over 21,000 e-texts have been produced by DP. There are also offshoots (sister sites) such as DP-Europe and DP-Canada.
- The Doe Network is a 100% volunteer organization devoted to assisting investigating agencies in bringing closure to national and international cold cases concerning Missing & Unidentified Persons.
- DREAM Challenges is a non-profit initiative to advance biomedical research via crowdsourced competitions. Each challenge provides an infrastructure for participants to build mathematical models and derive novel insight for a research question relevant to the disease context, score performance across participants, and subsequently work together with the top-performing participants to publish key results in an academic journal.
- Drift bottle experiments are citizen science experiments in which a surveying organization throws into large bodies of water, bottles containing messages requesting finders of the bottles to return the messages to the organization with a statement of the time and place at which the bottles were found, allowing the organization to determine patterns of water circulation in the bodies of water.
- Duolingo: With Duolingo users learned a language for free while helping to translate the web via their "Immersion" feature. The Immersion feature was retired in early 2017.

== E ==
- Ecomate, an Italian ESG B2B platform for calculating the ESG score of companies is crowdsourcing its technical scientific committee now counting more than 80 small consulting firms, non-profits and institutions with different experitse as well as more than 30 individual experts.
- Emporis, a provider of building data, has run the Emporis Community (a website where members can submit building information) since May 2000. Today, more than 1,000 members contribute building data throughout the world.
- The ESP Game by Luis von Ahn (later acquired by Google and renamed Google Image Labeler) started in 2003 and gets people to label images as a side-effect of playing a game. The image labels can be used to improve image search on the Web. This game led to the concept of Games with a purpose.
- EteRNA, a game in which players attempt to design RNA sequences that fold into a given configuration. The widely varied solutions from players, often non-biologists, are evaluated to improve computer models predicting RNA folding. Some designs are actually synthesized to evaluate the actual folding dynamics and directly compare with the computer models.
- Europeana 1914–1918 is a collaboration led by Europeana with support from The Great War Archive team at the University of Oxford. A website is used by the project to encourage the public from all European Union states to contribute information about World War I, especially their family's stories and digitised photographs of their artefacts. In addition to the website, since 2011 First World War stories have been collected in person from family history roadshow events held in Germany, Luxembourg, Ireland, Slovenia, Denmark, with further events planned in Cyprus, Belgium, Italy and more. The items collected by the project are released on the Internet for use under a Creative Commons licence.
- EyeWire, a game by Sebastian Seung in which players help an algorithm to segment retinal cells in 3D images of the retina. The aim is to map a mouse retina by extracting individual neurons and their connections to each other.

== F ==
- Facebook has used crowdsourcing since 2008 to create different language versions of its site. The company claims this method offers the advantage of providing site versions that are more compatible with local cultures.
- FamilySearch Indexing is a volunteer project which aims to create searchable digital indexes for scanned images of historical documents. The documents are drawn primarily from a collection of 2.4 million microfilms made of historical documents from 110 countries and principalities. Previously, volunteers installed free software on their home computers, downloaded images from the site, typed the data they read from the image into the software, and submitted their work back to the site. A web-based indexing application was launched in 2014, and the installed version was later retired. The data is eventually made publicly and freely available at familysearch.org (the world's largest nonprofit genealogical organization) for use in genealogical research. Over one billion historical records have been transcribed to date.
- Folding@Home is a distributed computing project for disease research that simulates protein folding, computational drug design, and other types of molecular dynamics. The project uses the idle processing resources of thousands of personal computers owned by volunteers who have installed the software on their systems. Its primary purpose is to determine the mechanisms of protein folding. This is of academic interest with implications for medical research into Alzheimer's disease, Huntington's disease, and many forms of cancer, among other diseases.
- Foldit invites the general public to play protein folding games to discover folding strategies. Citing Foldit, MSNBC's Alan Boyle reported that "video-game players have solved a molecular puzzle that stumped scientists for years," indicating that they "figure(d) out the detailed molecular structure of a protein-cutting enzyme from an AIDS-like virus found in rhesus monkeys."
- Freelancer.com started out in Sweden in 2004 as GetAFreelancer.com, and is now owned by Sydney, Australia-based Ignition Networks. M Barrie, the CEO, claims the company is the largest outsourcing site in the world, receiving more global traffic than competitor elance. The site has 1.5 million users in 234 countries and the average job size is under $200 and it projects a US$50 million in project turnover in the next 12 months. The site takes a 10 percent cut on work allocated.

== G ==
- Galaxy Zoo is a citizen science project that lets members of the public classify a million galaxies from the Sloan Digital Sky Survey. The project has led to numerous scientific papers and citizen scientist-led discoveries such as Hanny's Voorwerp.
- Gaspy is a petrol price monitoring app of New Zealand.
- "The Gateway to Astronaut Photography of Earth – Image Detective" is an interactive citizen science hunt for the Earth location of images taken from space by astronauts since the 1960s. Reviewing 1.8 million photos, individuals submit what they believe to be the location of a given photo, and thus accumulate "points" and "badges" on part of the NASA website.
- General Electric organized a "Multi-Million Dollar Challenge" to find new, breakthrough ideas for creating cleaner, more efficient, and economically viable grid technologies. The challenge also aimed to accelerate the adoption of smart grid technologies.
- Genius, according to their website, is "the world's biggest collection of song lyrics and crowdsourced musical knowledge." It was previously referred to as Rap Exegesis and Rap Genius to decode complex rap lyrics. Now their mission is to "annotate the world".
- Google Image Labeler was a sort of game where users were asked to label pictures to improve images search results.
- Gooseberry Patch, has been using crowdsourcing to create their community-style cookbooks since 1992. Friends, buyers, fans, sales people are all encouraged to submit a recipe. Each contributors' recipe that is selected is recognized in the book and receives a free copy.
- The Great War Archive was a 2008 project, led by the University of Oxford. It requested members of the general public to digitize any artifacts they held relating to the First World War and upload them to a purpose-built website. The project successfully released over 6500 items and stories online, which can be freely downloaded and used for education and research. The project was funded by the Joint Information Systems Committee. In 2011, the team at the University of Oxford received further funding from Europeana to run a similar crowdsourcing initiative in Germany. From 2012, Europeana extended the project to become a project called "Europeana 1914–1918", a collaboration led by Europeana, with support from the team at the University of Oxford. There is a website where the project encourages the public from all European Union states to contribute information about World War I, especially their family's stories and digitized photographs of their artifacts.
- The Guardian's investigation into the MP Expense Scandal in the United Kingdom. The newspaper created a system to allow the public to search methodically through 700,000 expense-claim documents. Over 20,000 people participated in finding erroneous and remarkable expense claims by members of parliament.

== H ==
- The Historical Marker Database is an online database that documents locations of numerous historical markers in the United States as well as other countries.
- The Vancouver Police Department has put up a website entitled Hockey Riot 2011, informing people about the VPD's investigations into the 2011 Stanley Cup Riot. It also asks people to contribute any pictures or video that they may have taken during the riot, with the goal of identifying people who may have participated in the rioting. The site also reminds people to not use social media to take justice into their own hands, instead leaving it to the police. As of 1 July 2011, 101 arrests have been made.

== I ==
- IBM collected over 37,000 ideas for potential areas for innovation from brainstorming sessions with its customers, employees and their family members in 2006.
- iNaturalist is a citizen science website which allows users to contribute observations of organisms with images, start data-collecting projects, and crowdsources taxonomic identification of observations.
- The Indian rupee sign was developed in 2010, by using crowdsourcing to select its design through an open competition among Indian residents.
- InfoArmy is a crowdsourcing platform for business data. Users research online for competitive intelligence information on public and private companies to create iPad and web reports. Current researchers come from a variety of backgrounds and from six continents.
- InnoCentive, started in 2001, crowdsources research and development for biomedical and pharmaceutical companies, among other companies in other industries. InnoCentive provides connection and relationship management services between "Seekers" and "Solvers". Seekers are the companies searching for solutions to critical challenges. Solvers are the 185,000 registered members of the InnoCentive crowd who volunteer their solutions to the Seekers. Anyone with interest and Internet access can become an InnoCentive Solver. Solvers whose solutions are selected by the Seekers are compensated for their ideas by InnoCentive, which acts as broker of the process. InnoCentive recently partnered with the Rockefeller Foundation to target solutions from InnoCentive's Solver crowd for orphan diseases and other philanthropic social initiatives.
- Innovation Exchange is an open innovation vendor which emphasizes community diversity; it sources solutions to business problems from both experts and novices. Companies sponsor challenges which are responded to by individuals, people working in ad hoc teams, or by small and mid-size businesses. In contrast to sites focused primarily on innovation in the physical sciences, Innovation Exchange fosters product, service, process, and business model innovation.

== J ==
- Jade Magnet is Asia's largest creative crowdsourcing platform for design solutions like logos, brochures, websites, flyers, animations with a focus on SMEs. It is a Technology platform supporting clients to extract multiple options for creative solutions before making a selection. Additionally as a value add, clients can make use of Delivery Assurance service to manage requirements

== K ==
- Kaggle is a platform for data prediction competitions. Kaggle facilitates better predictions by providing a platform for machine learning, data prediction and bioinformatics competitions. The platform allows organizations to have their data scrutinized by the world's best statisticians.
- Katawa Shoujo is an open source visual novel created by Four Leaf Studios, a volunteer development team assembled from 4chan and other internet communities.
- The Katrina PeopleFinder Project used crowdsourcing to collect data for lost persons. Over 4,000 people donated their time after Hurricane Katrina. It included 90,000 entries.
- Khan Academy is a non-profit organization founded by educational entrepreneur Salman Khan which has as its mission to provide a world-class education to anyone for free. It is relying on volunteers to subtitle into the widely spoken languages of the world Khan Academy's substantial collection of educational videos on subjects ranging from math to art history.

== L ==
- At LibriVox.org, volunteers record chapters of books in the public domain, and then release the audio files back onto the net for free. All the audio is donated back into the public domain.
- Life (Cycle) of the Hong Kong Newt is a 2024 Hong Kong short nature documentary directed by local nature photographer Fung Hon-shing. It features the life cycle and survival threats faced by Hong Kong newt, and is available on YouTube. The project also includes an exhibition of the same name held in April 2024, which covered this documentary, photographs, paintings, and installation art of newt bodies from roadkill, with the aim of raising public awareness.
- Life in a Day is Kevin Macdonald's 95-minute documentary film comprising an arranged series of video clips selected from 80,000 clips (4500 hours) submitted to the YouTube video sharing website, the clips showing respective occurrences from around the world on a single day. Yumi Goto of TIME LightBox remarked that "the most striking aspect of this documentary is that it's the first crowdsourced, user-generated content to hit the big screen." This was followed ten years later in 2021 with a new version, Life in a Day 2020, this time featuring over 300,000 submissions.
- The Living New Deal is a research project and online public archive documenting the scope and impact of the New Deal on Americans' lives and landscape. The Living New Deal relies on a network of Research Associates and other volunteers, including historians, teachers, students, artists, history buffs, librarians, journalists, and photographers to document New Deal sites throughout the U.S. Anyone can sign up to volunteer.
- L'Oreal used viewer-created advertising messages of Current TV to pool new and fresh advertising ideas.

== M ==
- Mapillary is a service for sharing geotagged photos developed by Mapillary AB with the aim to represent not only streets but the whole world. All photos and data are shared using a Creative Commons license, most of the internal software is available under the MIT license and the full API is public.
- MateCat is a web-based computer-assisted translation (CAT) tool released as open source software under the Lesser General Public License (LGPL) from the Free Software Foundation.
- McMaster Postcard Project is a platform created by the William Ready Division of Archives and Research Collections at the McMaster University Library for crowdsourcing information about an archival collection of historical postcards, providing information on the card's country, province and city of origin, date, and other pertinent information in a "notes" section. Cards were previously categorized only by province, or by country for international cards.
- Microtask is a company that has developed a software platform for global distribution of short-duration tasks to online workers. The system supports automated quality assurance and provides service-level agreements for task quality and turnaround times.
- The Milky Way Project is a project that aims to identify bubbles in the Milky Way with users analyzing infrared images from the Spitzer Space Telescope.
- Mindpixel was an online artificial intelligence project to build a knowledgebase of true/false statements, and ran from 2000 to 2005.
- Moovit is a transit app and platform which makes use of the crowd in two ways: first by letting community editors add and edit transit data (in locales where official data is not openly available), and second by letting app users report bus tardiness, crowdedness, etc. to other riders down the line in a similar fashion to Waze.
- Moral Machine is an online platform that generates moral dilemmas and collects information on the decisions that people think an autonomous vehicle should make between two death outcomes.
- Mozilla Common Voice is a project to help make voice recognition open to everyone. Volunteers can add and verify voice recordings. The database with recordings is available as open source.

== N ==
- Netflix Prize was an open competition for the best collaborative filtering algorithm that predicts user ratings for films, based on previous ratings. The competition was held by Netflix, an online DVD-rental service, and was completed in September 2009. The grand prize of $1,000,000 was reserved for the entry which bettered Netflix's own algorithm for predicting ratings by 10%. Netflix provided a training data set of over 100 million ratings that more than 480,000 users gave to nearly 18,000 movies, which is one of the largest real-life data sets available for research. The related forum maintained by Netflix has seen lively discussions and contributed a lot to the success of this competition. A very relevant fact to the power of crowdsourcing is that among the top teams are not only academic researchers, but laymen with no prior exposure to collaborative filtering (virtually learning the problem space from scratch).
- NotchUp is a company founded in 2008 offering crowdsourced job recruiting to find those who may passively be interested in new opportunities.
- Numbeo – worldwide studies based on reported consumer prices, perceived crime rates, quality of healthcare and other statistics. As of January 2020, 5,863,289 prices in 9,300 cities entered by 500,170 contributors.

== O ==
- Old Weather is a web-based effort to transcribe weather observations made by Royal Navy ships around the time of World War I. These transcriptions will contribute to climate model projections and improve a database of weather extremes and will be of use to historians in tracking past ship movements and the stories of the people on board.
- Online Biographical Dictionary of the Woman Suffrage Movement in the United States offers 3,700 volunteer-written biographies of suffragists.
- Online volunteering service (United Nations) is a free service that connects grassroots organizations, international NGOs, local governments, educational institutions and United Nations agencies with thousands of individuals ready to volunteer via the Internet to help address development challenges. The service was launched in 2000 and it quickly attracted thousands of people ready to volunteer online. In 2014 alone, UN Online Volunteers undertook 16,134 assignments.
- Open Food Facts gathers information and data on food products from around the world.
- OpenHistoricalMap is a historical map of the world using OpenStreetMap technology and processes.
- OpenSeaMap is a free nautical chart covering seas, lakes, inland waterways and rivers for the needs of sailors, divers, fishermen and canoeists. The data is collected by crowdsourcing. In a new project OpenSeaMap collect shallow water depths worldwide for making bathimetric charts.
- OpenSignal is a project to independently map cell phone carrier coverage and performance. All data is collected from a smartphone application that has been downloaded over 3.5m times worldwide.
- OpenStreetMap is a free editable map of the world, which has over 100,000 signed up contributors in mid-2009. Creation and maintenance of geospatial data is a labor-intensive task which is expensive using traditional approaches, and crowdsourcing is also being used by commercial companies in this area including Google and TomTom.
- Oxfam Novib (Netherlands) mid-2008 launched a crowdsourcing initiative named Doeners.net, meant for people to support the organization's campaigning activities.

== P ==
- Path launched a project to crowdsource translations for its mobile platform in April 2012.
- Pepsi launched a marketing campaign in early 2007 which allowed consumers to design the look of a Pepsi can. The winners would receive a $10,000 prize, and their artwork would be featured on 500 million Pepsi cans around the United States.
- PhraseApp is a translation management platform that can be used to translate digital content, software, games and apps. It offers an in-context-editor and professional human translation.
- The Phylo video game invites players to give in to their addictive gaming impulses while contributing to the greater good by trying to decode the code for genetic diseases.
- Planet Hunters is a citizen science project where users can try to find extrasolar planets identifying patterns in the brightness data of stars retrieved by the Kepler Space Mission.
- Prova (Swedish for "to try") launched December 2008 as a crowdsource marketplace that connects businesses with professional ad designers to create print designs, audio ads, video content, and digital designs. Ad designers from all over the world compete for ad creation projects listed on the site.

== Q ==
- Quantum Moves is a game developed under the ScienceAtHome umbrella project, designed by Center for Community Driven Research (CODER) at Aarhus University, which aims to merge theoretical and experimental quantum research with online community efforts to explore the potential for online citizen science in this otherwise highly specialized field.
- Queen Silvia Nursing Award is a crowdsourcing campaign to find and develop national elderly and dementia care services. The campaign runs annually since 2013 in Sweden and in 2014 also in Finland. It is hosted by Swedish Care International and uses the Innopinion gamified crowdsourcing platform.

== R ==
- reCAPTCHA uses CAPTCHA to help digitize the text of books while protecting websites from bots attempting to access restricted areas. Humans are presented images of the book and asked to provide the corresponding text. Twenty years of The New York Times have already been digitized.
- RootMetrics (a.k.a. Root Wireless) uses a mobile client application on various kinds of smartphones to collect data about carrier signal quality and data speeds, then transmits that data to its servers. Consumers can view the crowdsourced data online in the form of color-coded maps that aid purchasing decisions by showing unbiased data from different carriers side by side.
- Royal British Columbia Museum transcription project allows volunteers to transcribe documents in their collections to assist those papers in becoming more accessible.

== S ==
- SciStarter is a citizen science focused site that supports and promotes hundreds of projects that require crowdsourced help. Micro-tasks for volunteer supporters include things such as climatic observations, astronomical observations, image / video / audio capture, image tagging, audio description, data point assessment, etc.
- Secret London is composed mostly of Londoners who use the site to share suggestions and photos of London. Originally started as a Facebook Group in 2010 in response to a competition to win an internship at Saatchi & Saatchi, Secret London gained 150,000 members within two weeks. This early popularity prompted its founder, Tiffany Philippou, to appeal to the community to help build the group a website, which was launched 10 days later.
- SeeClickFix is a web tool that allows citizens to report non-emergency neighborhood issues, which are communicated to local government, as a form of community activism. It has an associated free mobile phone application. Similar to FixMyStreet.
- SESH (social entrepreneurship for sexual health) is a project that uses crowdsourcing to improve public health messaging, tools, and policies. The group has been recognized by the WHO-TDR as one of the leaders in social innovation for health. Individual crowdsourcing projects have created videos promoting HIV testing, videos promoting condom use, images promoting sexual health, and related topics.
- SETILive is an online project of Zooniverse. Its goal is to use the human brain's ability to recognize patterns to find extraterrestrial intelligences (ETIs).
- Show us a better way is a British crowdsourcing initiative that ask people a way to improve the communication of public data. The winning idea has been awarded with a £20,000 fund prize.
- Sightsmap is a sightseeing popularity heatmap overlaid on Google Maps, based on crowdsourcing: the number of Panoramio photos at each place in the world.
- Smartling is an enterprise translation management platform that can be used to crowdsource translations for digital content. IMVU, Cloudflare, and Path used the platform to crowdsource website translations.
- Smartsheet is an online software service and consultancy that enables businesses to track and manage work through online sharing and crowdsourcing methods. The company's Smartsourcing service enables people to anonymously submit and manage all phases of crowdsourced work processing. Amazon's Mechanical Turk is one of the work exchange platforms with which Smartsheet is integrated.
- Smithsonian transcription center is a crowdsourcing transcription project that invites volunteers to transcribe a wide variety of content in the Smithsonian Institution collections, including from the National Museum of African American History and Culture, Department of Paleobiology, and the Folklife Archives. Materials available for transcription include handwritten documents, audio and video materials.
- Snapwire is a platform that connects photographers with brands, publishers, small businesses, and creatives around the world looking for specific images that they cannot find through traditional stock photo services. Photo buyers post a request for authentic photography, set their own price and photographers compete for the posted amount, earn points, level up and receive up to 70% on their photo sales. Buyers get unique images that match their vision, and the winning photographers get paid.
- Star Citizen is a multiplayer space trading and combat simulation open development alpha video game project by Cloud Imperium Games launched in 2012. It is noted for being the highest crowdfunded video game and one of the highest-funded crowdfunding projects overall, having raised over US$500 million as of September 2022.
- Stardust@Home is an ongoing citizen science project, begun in 2006, using internet volunteer "clickworkers" to find interstellar dust samples by inspecting 3D images from the Stardust spacecraft.
- Student of Fortune is an online service that allows students to submit homework problems for tutors to answer through a tutorial service for a fee. Started by a high school dropout.
- SunShot Catalyst, run by the US Department of Energy, is a crowdsourced open innovation program based on a series of prize challenges with the goal of rapid creation and development of products and solutions for the U.S. solar marketplace.

== T ==
- TopCoder is a crowdsourcing company with a global community of designers, developers, data scientists, and competitive programmers who compete to develop the best solutions for Topcoder customers. Organizations like IBM, Honeywell, and NASA work with Topcoder to accelerate innovation, increase bandwidth, and tap into hard-to-find expertise. On 8 May 2016, Topcoder Announced that its Topcoder Community has grown to more than 1,000,000 registered members.
- Tomnod crowdsourced the identification of objects and places in satellite images using online map interfaces that engaged many people to each view and tag a small section of a large area on the planet. Projects included searching for the tomb of Genghis Khan, mapping earthquake damage after the 2011 Christchurch earthquake, Malaysia Flight 370, counting refugee camps in Somalia, and the search of the Tunante II. Tomnod has since been retired and is no longer active.
- Transcribe Bentham is a crowdsourced manuscript transcription project launched in 2010. It is run by University College London's Bentham Project, in association with other UCL partners and the University of London Computer Centre. The project makes available, via a specially designed transcription interface, digital images of UCL's Bentham Papers collection – the unpublished writings of the philosopher Jeremy Bentham, which run to some 60,000 manuscript folios – which volunteers are encouraged to transcribe. The transcripts are intended to contribute to the Bentham Project's production of the new edition of The Collected Works of Jeremy Bentham, and are uploaded to UCL's digital Bentham Papers repository, widening access to the collection. Media coverage has included a feature article in The New York Times, and a broadcast on Deutsche Welle radio. The project was shortlisted for the 2011 Digital Heritage Award, and received an Award of Distinction in the Digital Communities category of the 2011 Prix Ars Electronica. The open-source code for the project's transcription tool is available for reuse and customisation.

== U ==
- Unilever used the crowdsourcing platform IdeaBounty to find creative ideas for its next TV campaign for their snack food brand Peperami.
- Ushahidi (Swahili for "testimony" or "witness") is a website created in the aftermath of Kenya's disputed 2007 presidential election (see 2007–2008 Kenyan crisis) that collected eyewitness reports of violence sent in by email and text-message and placed them on a Google map. It is also the name of the open source software developed for that site, which has since been improved, released freely, and used for a number of similar projects.

== W ==
- Waze is a free turn-by-turn GPS application for mobile phones that uses crowdsourcing to provide routing and real-time traffic updates.
- "We Are The World 25 for Haiti (YouTube Edition)" is a massively collaborative charity song and music video produced by Canadian singer-songwriter Lisa Lavie and posted to the YouTube video sharing website to raise money for victims of the 12 January, 2010 Haiti earthquake. The video was the creation of a collaboration of 57 unsigned or independent YouTube musicians geographically distributed around the world. The Tokyo Times referred to J Rice's subsequently produced "We Pray for You" video, involving largely the same participants as were in Lavie's video, as an example of a trend to use crowdsourcing for charitable purposes.
- Wikipedia is often cited as a successful example of crowdsourcing, despite objections by co-founder Jimmy Wales to the term.
- Worth1000 is a community focused on creative contests, occasionally with financial incentives. Original contests invited members to submit manipulated images (typically using Photoshop) for specific themes, often of a comic nature. Now they have new contests regularly for photo effects (aka manipulated images), photography without effects, illustrations, writing and multimedia. While most contests are run by the website, anyone can apply to post a contest, and people seeking professional creative work like logo design are encouraged to add financial incentives to their requests for less playful creativity.

== X ==
- X-Prize is an innovation incentive prize using crowdsourcing mechanisms to tackle grand challenges that are considered failing as free markets. These represent pressing needs the humanity seeks solutions for, that previously have not been served by real entrepreneurial action.

== Z ==
- Zooniverse is an online citizen science platform that uses the active participation of human volunteers to complete projects requiring more subtle reasoning or perception than electronic computer networks. It began as a single astronomy project called Galaxy Zoo, which launched in 2007 and invited volunteers to classify images of galaxies from the Sloane Digital Sky Survey, in order to better understand galaxy morphology. Zooniverse grew from this effort and has diversified into projects in the humanities and other science domains. Humanities projects include Anti-Slavery Manuscripts with Boston Public Library, and Shakespeare's World with the Folger Shakespeare Library and Oxford English Dictionary. Ecology projects include Snapshot Serengeti, Wildcam Gorongosa and Penguin Watch. Anyone can build their own project on the free Project Builder. Zooniverse, its researchers and volunteers frequently publish research papers using the data created by volunteers.

== See also ==
- Comparison of crowdfunding services
- Crowdmapping Examples
- List of volunteer computing projects
- List of grid computing projects
- List of citizen science projects
- List of free and open-source Android applications
