= Ek Khiladi Bawan Pattey =

- Directed by: Ravi Khanna
- Produced by: Ashok Roy
- Starring: Vinod Khanna; Dev Kumar; Laxmi Chhaya; C.S. Dubey; Tarun Bose
- Edited by: V.Prabhakar
- Music by: Sonik Omi
- Release date: 15 February 1972
- Country: India
- Language: Hindi

Ek Khiladi Bawan Pattey (Hindi: एक खिलाड़ी बावन पत्ते) (transl. One Player Fifty-Two Cards) is a 1972 Bollywood film starring Dev Kumar, Vinod Khanna, Tarun Bose and Laxmi Chhaya.

== Cast ==
- Dev Kumar as Shekhar
- Vinod Khanna as Inspector Vinod (Pushpa's Husband) (Special Appearance)
- Padmarani as Pushpa (Shekhar's Sister)
- Naqi Jehan as Rekha
- Laxmi Chhaya as Bijli
- Tarun Bose as Dinanath (Shekhar's Father)
- Mohan Choti as Jackpot (Shekhar's Friend)
- Veeru Devgan as Jaggu (Vikram's sidekick)
- C.S. Dubey as Bansidhar
- Dulari as Shekhar's Mother
- Satyendra Kapoor as Inspector
- Ravi Khanna as Vikram
- Mehmood Junior as Shekhar's Friend
- Sajjan as Diwaan Saheb (Rekha's Father)
- Padmini Kolhapure as Young Pushpa (uncredited)
- Brahm Bhardwaj as News Editor

== Music ==
All lyrics are written by Hasrat Jaipuri; all music is composed by Sonik Omi.

| No. | Title | Singer(s) | Length |
|---|---|---|---|
| 1. | "Behrupiye Log Sare Firte Hai Kyu Mare Mare" | Asha Bhosle | 3:11 |
| 2. | "Ek Khilari Baawan Pattey" | Sonik Omi | 3:30 |
| 3. | "Gaadi Aai Illahabad Se" | Asha Bhosle | 6:28 |
| 4. | "Jab Pyaar Ka Mujh Me" | Asha Bhosle | 3:24 |
| 5. | "Le Le Ye Dil Ka Nagina" | Asha Bhosle | 3:10 |
| Total length: | | | 19:43 |
