= Wolfgang Hünnekens =

German television presenter and businessman

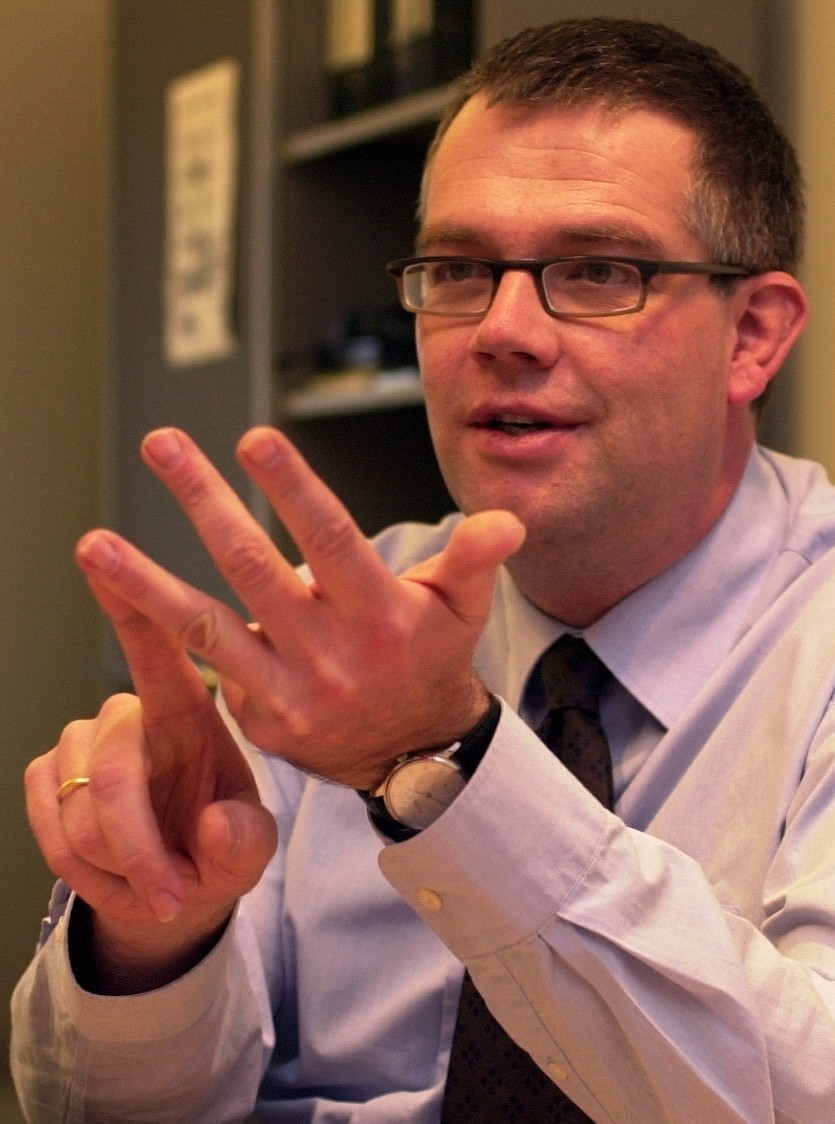
Wolfgang Hünnekens (2006)

Wolfgang Hünnekens ([ˈhʏnəkɛns]; born April 4, 1958, in Düsseldorf (Germany) is the founder of the Institute of Electronic Business (IEB), a TV presenter, a member of the Chamber of Industry and Commerce (IHK) Plenum Berlin and Chairman of the IHK Board “Creative Industries” as well as being Managing Partner of the Communication Agency Publicis Berlin till 2009. Since 2011, Wolfgang is one of two directors of the Institute of Electronic Business. He is a professor at the Berlin University of the Arts and the University of St. Gallen.

== Career ==
Hünnekens studied law in Berlin and Bonn. During his years of study, he founded the advertising agency Sisyphos with his school friend Franz Bayerz. Since 1995, under the name Publicis Berlin, the agency has been part of the Publicis Groupe.

Hünnekens was the initiator and founder of the Institute of Electronic Business (IEB), the first research institute at the Berlin University of the Arts. The IEB is currently financing the course Electronic Business and is thus a forerunner in the field of public-private partnership as it is run entirely without state funding. It is also a business platform and thus connects the fields of research, events, and training. From its foundation until 2003, Hünnekens was the first chairman of the IEB. As well as this, he is the co-founder of the Research Center for Digital Communication at the IEB.

From 2004 to 2005, Hünnekens was the presenter on the channel TV. Berlin in the Hünnekens Forum, the only TV talk show about commercial communication in Germany. The themes ranged from media politics and fees, advertising strategies, and brands to economic and political communication. Under discussion were developments in the IT field, as well as the opportunities and risks of the internet or e-business and e-commerce. The Hünnekens Forum accompanied and reflected the development of Berlin as a city of communication, whilst also sounding out the commercial aspects of the growing communication sector.

Since 2004, Hünnekens has been the chairman of the Berlin Chamber of Industry and Commerce Board “Creative Industries”. In this role, he is particularly interested in increasing the promotion of the creative industries. He would like to further this networking in Berlin, create an understanding of the particular opportunities and problems of the media and communication sector, and by doing this, increase awareness of these themes in the political arena.

Hünnekens is a founder of jovoto.com.

== Personal ==
Hünnekens is married, has two children, and lives in Berlin, Germany. He is an enthusiastic marathon runner (Berlin Marathon) as well as a confessed globetrotter. He supported with his former agency Publicis Berlin the work of the Berlin Center for the Treatment of Torture Victims.
