= Micro-volunteering =

Team of volunteers completing small tasks that make up a larger project

Micro-volunteering describes a volunteer, or team of volunteers, completing small tasks that make up a larger project. These tasks often benefit a research, charitable, or non-governmental organization. It differs from normal volunteerism as the tasks take only minutes to a few hours, and the volunteer does not make a long-term commitment. As a form of virtual volunteering, the tasks are usually distributed and completed online via an internet-connected device, including smartphones. It typically does not require an application process, screening or training period, takes only minutes or a few hours to complete, and does not require an ongoing commitment by the volunteer.

== History ==
At the global level, in 2000 the United Nations Volunteers programme launched the Online Volunteering service to provide a venue where individuals from across the globe can take action for sustainable human development by supporting the activities of development organizations over the Internet. Grassroots organizations, international NGOs, local governments, educational institutions, and United Nations agencies just need to register in this website, describe the microtask that should be addressed and launch a global call for support from individuals worldwide.

The term "microvolunteering" first appeared on 9 May 2006 within a response to a blog post on the U.K. mySociety platform. A few months later, a Spanish microvolunteering website registered the phrase "microvoluntarios" as a web domain name. Microvoluntarios created the first publicly accessible online micro-volunteering platform in May 2008, after the first micro-volunteering mobile phone application was submitted to a public Google Android competition by The Extraordinaries.

The concept was popularized by The Extraordinaries, a San Francisco-based social enterprise founded in January 2008. Their product is currently operating as Skills For Change. Other current popular microvolunteering projects include the platform Help From Home and Be My Eyes, a project focused on connecting volunteers to people with visual impairments in real time.

Micro-volunteering, online volunteering and online activism through social media are fast growing trends, but there have been some concerns. Some observers believe the digital divide may further exclude people with limited access to technology and that benefits are not as accessible in low-income countries. Others assert that technology has made volunteerism more impersonal by discouraging face-to-face interaction, possibly obstructing volunteer engagement. Additionally, some non-profit organizers are not convinced that it will be effective.

== Examples ==
The tasks involved in a micro-volunteering project are often similar to the crowdsourcing tasks found on crowdwork platforms such as Amazon Mechanical Turk. Tagging photos from a vast database or transcribing manuscripts are some examples. NASA's ClickWorkers project asks online volunteers to identify martian craters from photos.

However, nonprofits and non-governmental organizations have also successfully deployed micro-volunteer projects through text messaging. Volunteer health workers, for example, send SMS text messages to report basic symptoms of illness and disease. Plotting the geographical occurrence of these symptoms on maps (or "crowdmapping"), using programmes such as Kenyan-based Ushahidi can help epidemiologists to identify patterns of disease and provide early warning of potential outbreaks. In Rwanda, the government distributes cell phones to volunteer community health-care workers in rural areas. These are used to monitor the progress of pregnant village women, to send regular updates to health-care professionals, and to call for urgent assistance when necessary. The scheme has contributed significantly to reducing maternal deaths. SMS messaging is also a powerful tool for election monitoring organizations to support the work of volunteers. It can help them to address logistic challenges more rapidly as well as contributing to effective election oversight and the protection of citizens' rights.

Micro-volunteering is not always a solo activity, and some projects have included aspects of friendsourcing. Brady et al. explored this concept by forwarding visual questions from people with visual impairments to volunteers on Facebook. Questions were automatically posted to the volunteers' Facebook New Feeds, and responses to the question from the volunteers' friends were then returned to the original requestor.

== Relationship to online activism ==
Micro-volunteering is closely related to micro-activism, where organizations recruit online volunteers to complete small acts of advocacy. For example, in 2013, the Human Rights Campaign spread a logo for marriage equality on Facebook through user profile pictures to raise awareness for the issue. These efforts are sometimes labelled as "slacktivism", as they require very little commitment from volunteers and their effectiveness is debated. Savage et al. also encouraged online activism in an interactive method by using a Twitter bot to seek out and contact potential volunteers.

== See also ==
- Crowdsourcing
- Distributed computing
- Virtual volunteering
- Volunteer
- Volunteer computing
