= Tomnod =

Crowdsourcing project to examine satellite images

- Website type: crowdsourcing platform / web application
- Owner: DigitalGlobe
- Website: tomnod.com
- Commercial: No
- Registration: Yes
- Current status: Retired

Tomnod was a project owned by Colorado-based satellite company DigitalGlobe that used crowdsourcing to identify objects and places in satellite images. It was announced Tomnod was no longer using crowdsourcing of images as of 1 August 2019.

== History ==
Originally a research project of the University of California, San Diego in 2010, Tomnod (Mongolian for "big eye") was founded by Shay Har-Noy, Luke Barrington, Nate Ricklin and Albert Yu Min Lin. Three years later, Tomnod was acquired by the company DigitalGlobe while incubating at EvoNexus. Tomnod used online map interfaces that engage many people to each view and tag a small section of a large area on the planet. In 2011 Tomnod cooperated with the UNHCR to locate refugee camps in Somalia. Users were asked to use satellite images to count the shelters of refugees. Other projects include searching for the tomb of Genghis Khan, mapping damage after Typhoon Haiyan, and searching for Malaysia Airlines Flight 370.

=== Finding wreckage of Malaysia Airlines Flight 370 ===
Starting in March 2014 Tomnod took images gathered by DigitalGlobe satellites and offered them to the public for viewing and identification in the disappearance of Malaysia Airlines Flight 370. Over 8 million people used the site to look for signs of wreckage, oil spills and other objects of interest. Prior to this search effort Tomnod had 10,000 contributors for other projects on the site. Users could tag images which are later reviewed with algorithms. The site was down on 11 and 12 March due to high traffic (100,000 visits per minute). It was reported that over 650,000 "objects of interest" had been tagged by users on Tomnod and that their maps had been viewed over 98 million times. Originally Tomnod had included 24,000 km^{2} of satellite imagery for users to search. Later they included maps of 14,000 km^{2} of the Straits of Malacca and the Indian Ocean as new information was released.

== See also ==
- List of crowdsourcing projects - Tomnod
- Crowdsourcing
- Crowdsearching
- Virtual volunteering
