= Mid-Cambridge =

Coordinates: 42°22′21.50″N 71°06′34.75″W

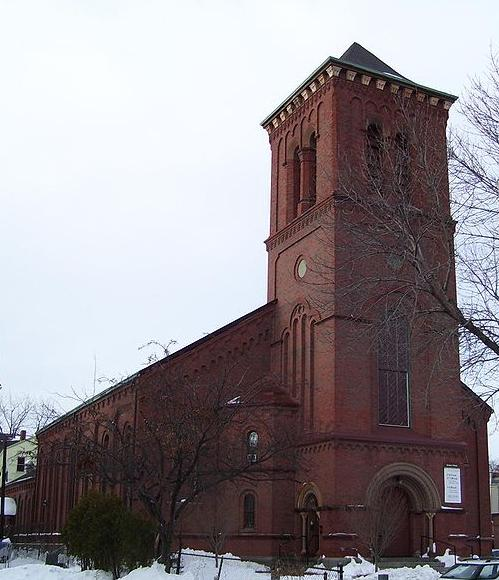
Historic Christ the King Presbyterian Church on Prospect Street in Mid-Cambridge was constructed in 1851 by Alexander Esty

Mid-Cambridge, also known as "Area 6", is a neighborhood of Cambridge, Massachusetts. It is bounded by Massachusetts Avenue on the south and west, Prospect Street on the east, and Hampshire Street, the Somerville border, Kirkland Street, Quincy Street, and Cambridge Street on the north. The neighborhood borders Central Square, Harvard Square, and Inman Square.

Neighborhood anchors include Harvard University, Cambridge Health Alliance, Cambridge City Hall, and the main branch of the Cambridge Public Library.

In 2005, the neighborhood had a population of 13,285 residents in 5,989 households. The average household income was $50,410.
