= City quality of life indices =

City quality of life indices are lists of cities that are ranked according to a defined measure of living conditions. In addition to considering the provision of clean water, clean air, adequate food and shelter, many indexes also measure more subjective elements including a city's capacity to generate a sense of community and offer hospitable settings for all, especially young people, to develop social skills, a sense of autonomy and identity.

The reason some cities appear in one ranking but not another is often related to the different criteria used between rankings, but more commonly it is related the difference in weighting given to similar factors.

== Global Liveability Index ==
The Global Liveability Index is a yearly assessment published by the Economist Intelligence Unit (EIU), ranking 173 global cities for their quality of life based on assessments of stability, health care, culture and environment, education and infrastructure. Copenhagen was ranked the most liveable city in 2025, while Damascus was ranked the least liveable. Cities from the Western world dominate the top 10, reflecting their widespread availability of goods and services, low personal risk, and effective infrastructure.

Global Liveability Index 2025: Top 10
Rank	City	Country	Index	Stability	Healthcare	Culture and environment	Education	Infrastructure
1	Copenhagen	Denmark	98.0	100.0	95.8	95.4	100.0	100.0
2	Vienna	Austria	97.1	95.0	100.0	93.5	100.0	100.0
2	Zurich	Switzerland	97.1	95.0	100.0	96.3	100.0	96.4
4	Melbourne	Australia	97.0	95.0	100.0	95.8	100.0	96.4
5	Geneva	Switzerland	96.8	95.0	100.0	94.9	100.0	96.4
6	Sydney	Australia	96.6	95.0	100.0	94.4	100.0	96.4
7	Osaka	Japan	96.0	100.0	100.0	86.8	100.0	96.4
7	Auckland	New Zealand	96.0	95.0	95.8	97.9	100.0	92.9
9	Adelaide	Australia	95.9	95.0	100.0	91.4	100.0	96.4
10	Vancouver	Canada	95.8	95.0	95.8	97.2	100.0	92.9

== Monocle's Quality of Life Survey ==
Since 2006, the lifestyle magazine Monocle has published an annual list of top locations for quality of life. Important criteria in this survey are safety/crime, international connectivity, climate/sunshine, quality of architecture, public transport, tolerance, environmental issues and access to nature, urban design, business conditions, proactive policy developments and medical care.

Monocle's Quality of Life Survey 2026
Rank	City	Country/Region
1	Tokyo	Japan
2	Copenhagen	Denmark
3	Lisbon	Portugal
4	Vienna	Austria
5	Sydney	Australia
6	Zurich	Switzerland
7	Madrid	Spain
8	Paris	France
9	Munich	Germany
10	Oslo	Norway
11	Stockholm	Sweden
12	Milan	Italy
13	Barcelona	Spain
14	Singapore	Singapore
15	Amsterdam	Netherlands
16	Helsinki	Finland
17	Seoul	South Korea
18	Melbourne	Australia
19	Vancouver	Canada
20	Kyoto	Japan
20	Perth	Australia

== Mercer's Quality of Living Ranking ==
American global human resources and related financial services consulting firm Mercer annually releases its Quality of Living City Ranking, comparing 241 cities based on 39 criteria (including safety, education, hygiene, health care, culture, environment, recreation, political-economic stability, public transport and access to goods and services). New York City is given a baseline score of 100 and other cities are rated in comparison. The list is intended to help multinational companies decide where to open offices or plants and how much to pay employees.

Mercer's Quality of Living Ranking 2024
Rank	City	Country/Region
1	Zürich	Switzerland
2	Vienna	Austria
3	Geneva	Switzerland
4	Copenhagen	Denmark
5	Auckland	New Zealand
6	Amsterdam	Netherlands
7	Frankfurt	Germany
7	Vancouver	Canada
9	Bern	Switzerland
10	Basel	Switzerland
11	Munich	Germany
12	Sydney	Australia
13	Toronto	Canada
14	The Hague	Netherlands
14	Wellington	New Zealand
16	Düsseldorf	Germany
17	Luxembourg	Luxembourg
18	Stockholm	Sweden
19	Berlin	Germany
20	Montreal	Canada
21	Melbourne	Australia
22	Oslo	Norway
23	Ottawa	Canada
24	Perth	Australia
25	Calgary	Canada

== Numbeo's Quality of Life Ranking ==
Numbeo is a crowd-sourced global database of reported consumer prices, perceived crime rates, quality of health care, among other statistics. The rankings are updated twice per year.

Numbeo's Quality of Life Index 2026
Rank	City	Country/Region
1	The Hague	Netherlands
2	Eindhoven	Netherlands
3	Rotterdam	Netherlands
4	Utrecht	Netherlands
5	Gent	Belgium
6	Stuttgart	Germany
7	Groningen	Netherlands
8	Luxembourg	Luxembourg
9	Nuremberg	Germany
10	Gothenburg	Sweden
11	Stavanger	Norway
12	Copenhagen	Denmark
13	Amsterdam	Netherlands
14	Dusseldorf	Germany
15	Bergen	Norway
16	Vienna	Austria
17	Munich	Germany
18	Frankfurt	Germany
19	Helsinki	Finland
20	Reykjavik	Iceland

The full ranking includes 242 cities.

== Happy City Index ==
The Happy City Index produced by the Institute for Quality of Life uses 23 different areas of activity, divided into five key categories to determine the overall sense of happiness among residents directly relating to their quality of life. The ranking includes all cities whose activities can be measured based on objective, transparent, and verifiable data. It also highlights cities that demonstrate exceptional achievements in terms of quality of life.

Happy City Index 2026
Rank	City	Country/Region
1	Copenhagen	Denmark
2	Helsinki	Finland
3	Geneva	Switzerland
4	Uppsala	Sweden
5	Tokyo	Japan
6	Trondheim	Norway
7	Bern	Switzerland
8	Malmö	Sweden
9	Munich	Germany
10	Aarhus	Denmark
11	Zurich	Switzerland
12	Barcelona	Spain
13	Espoo	Finland
14	Oslo	Norway
15	The Hague	Netherlands
16	Ballarat	Australia
17	Aalborg	Denmark
18	Yokohama	Japan
19	Lugano	Switzerland
20	Reykjavik	Iceland
21	Jönköping	Sweden
22	Singapore	Singapore
23	Grenoble	France
24	Stuttgart	Germany
25	Paris	France

== See also ==
- European Green Capital Award – Award for a European city based on its environmental record
- Global city – City important to the world economy
- Healthy city – Concept in urban design for health
- List of most expensive cities for expatriate employees
- List of largest cities
- Urban vitality – Intensity of use of an urban area
