= Snapwire =

Image sharing website

- Company type: Private
- Headquarters: Santa Barbara, California, U.S.
- Area served: Worldwide
- Founders: Chad Newell; Sky Gilbar; Ryan Dewane
- Industry: Photography, Video
- Products: Production Platform, Global Creative Marketplace, Digital images, full copyright buyout, Royalty-free images and videos
- Employees: 20+
- Website: snapwire.co
- Launched: March 6, 2014
- Current status: Sold

Snapwire was a platform that allowed users to take photos and videos in response to a request for brands, publishers, small businesses, and creatives who were seeking images that fulfilled certain requirements. Buyers posted a creative image brief (called a Request) and photographers responded by submitting their photos through the Snapwire website or mobile app. Winning photographers were awarded and paid. Aside from Requests, Snapwire regularly ran creative Challenges concerning popular stock photo image needs. Challenges were curated by Snapwire and open to the public.

Snapwire had a searchable library of photos called the Marketplace, which consisted of hand-selected images with varying price points. In July 2014, the number of photos in Marketplace had reached 150,000; in 2020, the company had over 5,000,000 images. Every photo on the Marketplace offered a royalty-free license that businesses could purchase the rights to use commercially. As the company evolved, there was a move away from stock photo licensing to bespoke content creation and it began to offer a marketplace platform offering paying photo and video jobs from enterprise brands to applying creators based on various matched attributes which included location, budget and skills.

In May 2022, Snapwire was acquired by StudioNow.

== History ==
In 2012, Chad Newell (Chief Executive Officer) and Sky Gilbar co-founded Snapwire Media Inc. In 2017, Ryan Dewane (Chief Operation Officer) became co-founder.

Chad Newell started working in the industry as a researcher at a stock photo library named Image Bank that was later acquired by Getty Images. In 2001, he co-founded Media Bakery – a premium stock photography agency with 10 million images aggregated from 170 sources that have all licensing models (macro stock, mid stock, and micro stock) and is one of the largest independent stock photo agencies in North America.

Snapwire opened to the public in March 2014. In July 2014 Snapwire launched version 2.0, which allowed photographers to create personal portfolios and sell images from these. With its 2.0 version the company made a move towards becoming a photo sharing website. At the same time, Snapwire announced a partnership with gram30 – a Japanese-based startup studio focusing on incubating and developing new products and services. In October 2014, Snapwire collaborated with Adobe to bring selected features of Adobe Photoshop CC and Lightroom to the Snapwire iOS app. The application was revealed at Adobe MAX 2014 show in Los Angeles. On October 1, 2014, the company opened its first international office in Tokyo.

In 2016, the founding team was accepted into The Alchemist Accelerator and graduated with Class 16 in October 2017. The company raised a Series Seed shortly after pitching investors at The Alchemist Demo Day. In the fall of 2019, the company raised its Series A from Defy Partners.

In May 2022, Snapwire was sold to Nashville-based StudioNow, Inc.

=== Funding ===
About three months after the company's formal launch in March 2014, it had secured a $1.4 million seed round, with investor Sadato Tanaka. Other notable users include Alan Meckler, Allen Morgan, Tom Glocer, Safa Rashtchy, Scott Jarus, Chaotic Investments, Roger Fishman, Dave Morgan, Spencer Huang, and Mark Kingdon. In August 2015, Snapwire completed a "testing the waters" campaign on equity crowdfunding platform SeedInvest to gauge interest from their users in investing in the company. In December 2016 the company successfully raised proceeds under the Title 3 of the Jumpstart Our Business Jobs Act on Startengine, which yielded net proceeds of approximately $168,000. In April 2017, the company successfully closed another round of equity crowdfunding of approximately $198,000 on Wefunder. In 2018, the company secured another $900K in seed funding from The Band of Angels, Santa Barbara Angel Alliance, Entrada Ventures and other notable angel investors. In 2019, the company closed a Series A financing led by Defy Partners.

== See also ==
- List of crowdsourcing projects
