= Ravi Khanna =

Indian actor, journalist and writer (born 1957)

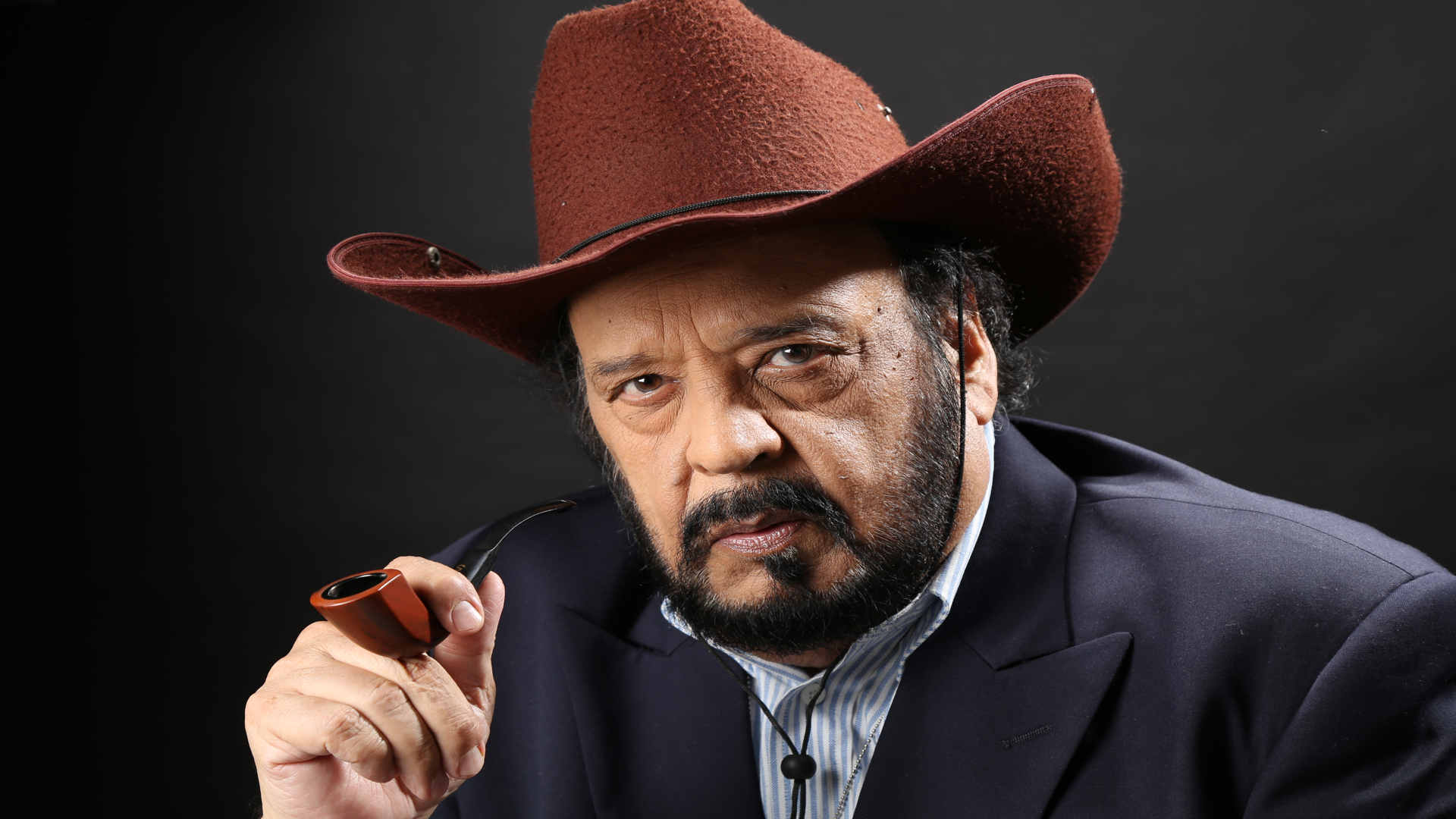
- Born: 15 March 1957 (age 69); Delhi, India
- Occupations: Actor, journalist, writer

Ravi Khanna (born 15 March 1957) is an Indian actor, journalist and writer.

Ravi Khanna is a Mumbai-based international character actor who spent more than 24 years as a radio and TV journalist in the Voice of America Newsroom in USA, after doing 10 years of theater in New Delhi during the 1970s. He starred in Arrange to Settle. After his return from USA to Mumbai in 2015, he picked up his acting career with a crucial role in that year's blockbuster Bajrangi Bhaijaan with Salman Khan in the lead. He also acted in an English play by Tom Stoppard called Indian Ink staged by the Studio Theater and won an award for his acting.
