= Numbeo =

Crowd-sourced online database

Numbeo.com
- Website type: Crowd-sourced online database of cost of living, real property prices, and quality of life statistics
- Available in: Multilingual
- Founded: April 2009
- Country of origin: Serbia
- Owner: NUMBEO DOO Beograd-Palilula
- Founder: Mladen Adamović
- Website: www.numbeo.com
- Registration: Optional
- Launched: April 2009

Numbeo is a Serbian crowd-sourced online database of perceived consumer prices, real property prices, and quality of life metrics. The website was founded in April 2009 by former Google employee Mladen Adamović, to enable users to share and compare information about the cost of living between countries and cities. Since 2012, the website has been operated by NUMBEO DOO Beograd-Palilula, a Serbian private limited company run by Adamović. According to Adamović, the website earns money through advertising and the sale of subscriptions to its API.

== Methodology ==
Numbeo's crowd-sourced data can be inserted or altered by anyone accessing the website, and is not peer-reviewed. Data is also manually gathered by the operator, from sources such as company and governmental websites, which is done in half-year intervals; it is then combined with user-generated data by giving it extra weight in the final score calculation, according to the company. As of 2017, it was the largest database of user generated data about cities in the world. As of 2020, this possibly applied to (user generated) data on housing prices as well.

== Indexes ==
The quality of life index is a combination of eight sub-indexes: purchasing power, safety, healthcare, cost of living, property price to income ratio, traffic commute time, pollution, and climate.

The website's "Crime Index", intended to serve as an overall crime level estimate, is compiled from answers to user surveys, which have been processed by a Java-programmed backend to produce country- or city-level ratings on a 100-point scale, with higher values indicating worse crime. There is also a "Safety Index", with higher scores indicating a safer city.

These indexes feed into the site's composite Quality of Life Index. Country and city tables are published separately, with past editions archived online.

=== Health Care Index ===
How the index is calculated

The Health Care Index is a ranking of healthcare quality in cities and countries. New editions appear twice a year, and a continuously updated version is maintained on the site. News outlets sometimes cite the index when comparing national health systems, and it has appeared as a data source in academic work. Its reliance on self-selected online respondents, however, means it measures perception rather than clinical outcomes, a limitation Numbeo itself notes.

Respondents rate the healthcare available where they live across several dimensions: staff skill and competency, speed of examinations, availability of modern equipment, accuracy and completeness of care, friendliness of personnel, waiting times, convenience of location, and cost. Each answer is scored on a five-point scale from −2 to +2. The overall index is a weighted average of these components in which cost counts double; a second variant applies an exponential scale, which Numbeo suggests captures differences between systems more sharply. Published figures are rescaled to run roughly from 0 to 100 — higher meaning better perceived care. By 2026 the survey had drawn over 50,000 responses covering more than 4,500 cities. Numbeo filters suspected spam and withholds figures for locations with too few contributions.

A 2023 study in the International Journal of Environmental Research and Public Health used Numbeo's healthcare data, together with WHO indicators and the Global Health Security Index, to examine how healthcare financing models shaped countries' resilience during the COVID-19 pandemic.

== Criticism ==
Numbeo's data points on crime have been criticized by academics and by the media as unreliable and, at times, misleading.

- In 2017, a Swedish man manipulated the crime stats of Lund, Sweden by repeatedly submitting negative ratings in this category, at a time when the relevant data set was very small. In less than a day, he succeeded in making it show up as the most dangerous city in the world on the website's "Crime Index Rate" page. He commented: "Numbeo should hardly be considered stats, it’s more like reviews. Anyone, anywhere in the world can change the data, as many times as they want. Completely anonymously."
- In 2022, a Numbeo claim that Bradford, England was "Europe's most dangerous city" went viral on social media and was reported on in British press. Another English city, Coventry, was ranked second in this statistic, which was disputed by a local newspaper journalist—citing higher official crime rates in various other English cities/counties.
- In 2022, David Weinberger expressed criticism of the site's methodology of measuring crime rate, saying: "It is misleading to claim to have derived from this a representation of the highest-crime rate cities: what is presented are cities which are perceived as those with the most crime, by a certain number of Internet users. But for studies in the social sciences, this approach is worthless." The crime and security indices' measurements are derived from answers to a 15-point questionnaire. Experts responding to AFP's fact-checkers' inquiries regarding reliability of Numbeo's crime stats contended that this does not make for a methodologically valid victimization survey, due to non-representative sampling, and that—especially with respect to cross-country comparisons which are considered effectively impossible to validly construct (except for certain crimes that may be experienced the same way across communities, such as car theft)—the site's information is false.
- The main objection to the index is methodological. Anyone with an internet connection can submit a rating, so the sample is neither random nor representative, and it varies enormously in size from one city to another. A country's score can therefore diverge sharply from what mortality rates, life expectancy or clinical audits would suggest. Numbeo describes the index as reflecting the perceptions and experiences of its contributors rather than measured outcomes.

== See also ==
- Housing affordability index
- City quality of life indices
- Where-to-be-born Index
- List of crowdsourcing projects

=== Other health indexes ===
- World Health Organization ranking of health systems
- Euro health consumer index
