= Jade Magnet =

Indian crowdsourcing platform

Jade Magnet Online Private Limited

- Screenshot A screenshot of Jade Magnet's homepage (March 2013)
- Company type: Private
- Website type: Business to Business (B2B) Crowdsourcing platform
- Founded: Bangalore, Karnataka, India (October 15, 2009)
- No. of locations: Bangalore, Doha, Singapore, California, London
- Area served: Worldwide
- Founders: Sitashwa Srivastava and Manik Kinra
- Industry: Design
- Products: Marketing communications|Creative marketing products such as animations, logos, websites, brochures, print ads, etc
- Services: Crowdsourcing creative work
- Website: www.jademagnet.com
- Current status: Dissolved

Jade Magnet was an online crowdsourcing platform for creative and marketing support services based in Bangalore, India. It was founded in 2009 by Sitashwa Srivastava and Manik Kinra. The company has white label partnerships in Qatar as Mixilion and in Singapore as id8on.

Jade Magnet crowdsources design requirements for marketing campaigns (logos, websites, brochures, print ads, animation videos) to freelancers, professionals, small agencies and technology from teams across the world. Initially established as an open crowdsourcing platform, Jade Magnet moved to a "managed crowdsourcing" model in 2013 wherein the company curates teams of designers from the crowd to provide solution to its clients’. It offers delivery assurance to its clients and handles the full project management, payments and legal contracts of crowdsourced output.

Designers could apply to become providers on their network, as well as visiting colleges for recruitment.

== Company history ==
Jade Magnet was co-founded by Sitashwa Srivastava and Manik Kinra, who were classmates at the Great Lakes Institute of Management. The company was born out of their idea to develop a crowdsourcing platform, based on the notion that solutions coming from a physically disconnected world could still serve business needs.

The idea behind establishing the company was to tap the market space comprising millions of small and medium businesses around the world which need creative support in their marketing campaigns but are unable to work with large creative agencies due to budget constraints. Crowdsourcing could cater to the needs of all such businesses on a single platform, bridging the gap between small businesses that could not afford big agency fee, and freelancers who were looking for creative freedom and opportunity. Also, there was an opportunity to work for large and mature businesses in search of new creative ideas for their marketing campaigns and willing to experiment with more people than traditional agencies can provide.

There's a case study being written on why the business after scaling up couldn't reach the next level by professors in Great Lakes Institute of Management. The founders, Sitashwa has moved on to do startup in financial services vertical called Stockal while Manik has started a venture in Real Estate Space called Pin Click

=== Contest Based Platform ===
Under a pilot program for testing the business model by the name of creADivity, the founders brought on-board 45 providers and got their first five customers. In July 2008, creADivity got selected for The Indus Entrepreneurs’ (TiE) Entrepreneurial Acceleration Program (EAP), which selects one or two startup companies every year and assists in funding, mentoring and networking to support them. The program provides role models in successful entrepreneurs, and helps with the support required by early-stage entrepreneurs.

Joining the TiE Program also helped Manik and Sitashwa raise initial seed funding, with the help of which they launched the platform, rebranded by the name of Jade Magnet, on 15 October 2009. The name was changed from CreADivity since it was observed that people found it difficult to pronounce the name and place the brand. The company's new name was derived from Jade – a precious stone with sacred connotations in many cultures, and Magnet that signifies an ability to pull towards itself anything that comes close to it. The design of the company's logo itself was the result of a crowdsourcing exercise, where multiple designers created more than 15 design options. The logo that was finally chosen symbolises high-value by juxtaposing "a” and "g” together ("Ag" is the scientific name of silver), with the "g" falling slightly to represent the magnetic force of gravity.

Under the contest –based platform, customers looking crowdsourced design requirements could register on the website and post a project. Jade Magnet set a minimum payout limit for categories of creative projects, below which market dynamics have shown that there are no takers for given tasks. Customers post projects for a budget above the pre-set minimum, 80% of which is paid out to the winning entry. Once the project was posted as a contest, it received a number of entries from providers registered on the platform. Customers then shortlisted up to five entries from these and made a final choice after any modifications.

Providers looking to participate in design contests on the Jade Magnet platform registered on the website. Registered designers could participate in the projects of their interest and submit their work in response to the posted requirements. The client selected the design which was found most appropriate.

In its first three years of establishment, Jade Magnet got on board around 8000 freelancers and small agencies in its network, delivered more than 2000 design and technology projects to nearly 1000 customers, and awarded about $650,000 as prize money to designers.

=== Managed Crowdsourcing ===
After trying out the open crowdsourcing model and a closed group delivery assurance for a few years, Jade Magnet moved to a Managed Crowdsourcing model in 2013, where they create teams of experts by bringing together the best providers. This helps get the best designs out as the first step from multiple designers and then work with the team to deliver the output to the client. Crowdsourcing thus helps businesses get access to a larger pool of the best available talent from among freelancers, who would otherwise not be available within a single organisation or agency.

== Joint ventures ==
Mixilion logo

=== Mixilion ===
In September 2012, Jade Magnet entered the Middle East with a joint venture as Mixilion, which is headquartered in Doha (Qatar). Mixilion is the Middle East's first crowdsourcing platform and provides solutions to SMEs in the region using Jade Magnet's technology back end and a localised delivery assurance model.

id8on logo

=== id8on ===
In October 2012, Jade Magnet entered into a joint venture with a technology firm in Singapore as id8on, with the help of which it expanded its operations in the Asia-Pacific (APAC) region.

== Products ==
The creative marketing solutions provided by Jade Magnet include:

- Logo/brand designs
- Advertisements (banner ads for online campaigns, print ads for print campaigns and billboard ads for out-of-home campaigns)
- Web design (basic websites, dynamic websites, microsites, prototypical platforms)
- Brochure designs
- Animation videos
- Application UI
- Digital marketing
- Online Marketing (including search engine optimisation and social media marketing)
- Template designs of other marketing collateral like newsletters, stationery, emailers, power point presentations and document templates

== Platform technology ==
The key to scaling the crowdsourcing business lies in automation of as many crowd-management processes as possible and Jade Magnet has created, executed, analysed and fine-tuned many such processes. Jade Magnet is built on the Symfony framework with a MySQL back-end. The platform is a cloud-hosted application at Amazon Web Services. Jade Magnet is building a new sales support and portfolio application that organises collateral designs by category and cost to enable Jade Magnet sales team and account managers close deals faster. It doubles up as a design showcase for provider portfolios at Jade Magnet.

== Partnerships ==
- Wanobe in October 2011 to provide services to Small and Medium Businesses in UK
- Indiamart in December 2011, to enhance the marketing strategies of SMEs and cater to their needs of design solutions cost effectively
- Zipdial in December 2011 to provide collaborative solutions to SMEs in India
- Appsfunder in January 2012 for cross-marketing each other's services into their communities
- Kuliza Technologies in April 2012 to get Indian SMEs Online on Amazon
- Design Partner at the NASSCOM Product Conclave, 2012

== Awards and recognition ==
- Selected by TiE for its Entrepreneurial Acceleration Program (EAP) and raised seed capital with TiE support (2009)
- Selected among India's Hottest Startups by Business Today magazine (2010)
- Most promising technology startup at Global Technology Summit, Palo Alto(2011)
- Featured in TiE Global Annual Report among promising startups (2011)
- Selected by NASSCOM as part of the EMERGE 50 group of companies in India (2011)
- Nominated for South Asia's Manthan Awards as an innovative digital business (2011)
- Case study on Jade Magnet was among the winning cases chosen for publishing in 2012 at the ISB-Ivey Global Case Competition 2012, organised by the Indian School of Business
- Case study on Jade Magnet on Harvard Business Review

== See also ==
- Crowdsourcing
- Crowdsourcing creative work
- List of crowdsourcing projects
