= Cambridge Public Library =

- U.S. National Register of Historic Places
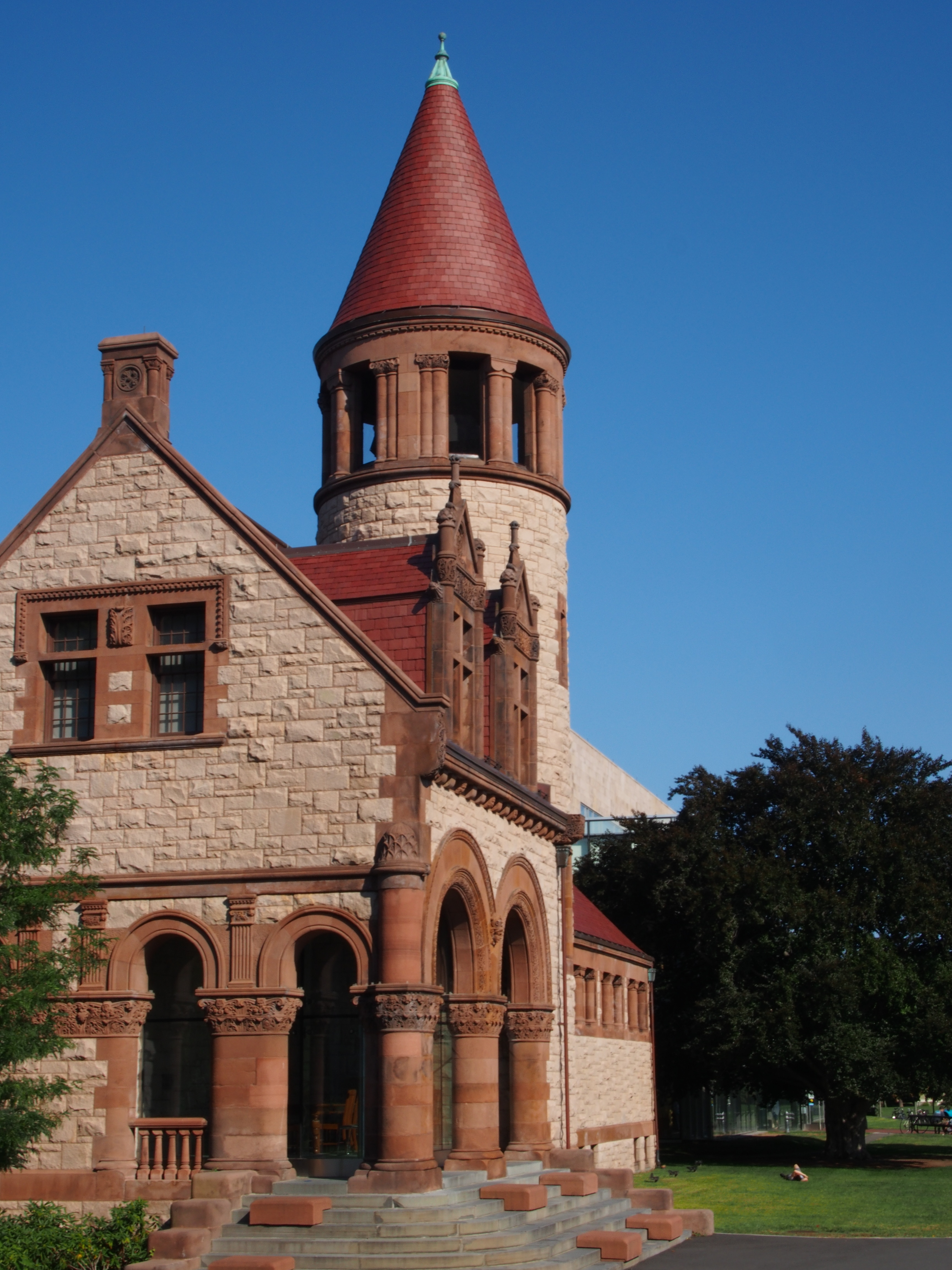
- 1888 building

- Location within Massachusetts Location within the United States
- Location: Cambridge, Massachusetts
- Coordinates: 42°22′26.8″N 71°06′38.9″W
- Built: 1888
- Architect: Van Brunt & Howe (1888); William Rawn Associates (2009)
- Architectural style: Richardsonian Romanesque
- MPS: Cambridge MRA
- NRHP reference No.: 82001931
- Added to NRHP: April 13, 1982

The Cambridge Public Library (CPL) in Cambridge, Massachusetts, is a public library that consists of a unified city-wide system maintaining: a main branch, of notable aesthetic architectural value, plus a further six localized branches sited throughout the city. Having evolved from the Cambridge Athenaeum, the main library branch was built at its present site in 1888. The main library most recently underwent renovation, and a modern building addition significantly expanded the overall branch in 2009, which greatly increased the branch's area, more than tripling its square footage. The library is also on the United States National Register of Historic Places.

At current the library system holds more than 314,607 items, where in addition to traditional library services, the Cambridge Public Library provides services such as e-books, audiobooks, tax preparation, large print, films, music, graphic novels, online resources, newspapers, magazines and educational programs among others. The library provides city-wide delivery services to homebound residents of Cambridge.

== History of organization ==
The Cambridge Public Library developed out of the Cambridge Athenaeum, which was founded in 1849 as "a lyceum, public library, and reading room with a building on the corner of Massachusetts Avenue and Pleasant Street where Cambridge residents could borrow books at the cost of one dollar per year.

The City of Cambridge acquired the Cambridge Athenaeum in 1858 and renamed it the Dana Library for use as both a city hall and a public library. By 1866, the Library moved to the corner of Massachusetts Avenue and Temple Street. In 1874, the library became free to the public and was renamed the Cambridge Public Library. Through the philanthropic endeavors of Frederick H. Rindge (and the Rindge Family), the main branch of the Cambridge Public Library was subsequently moved to the Mid-Cambridge neighborhood where it was built in 1888 at 449 Broadway.

In 2020 the CPL sought to partially fund the establishment of the Community based - Cambridge Public Library STEAM Academy.

== City Branches ==
=== Main Library ===
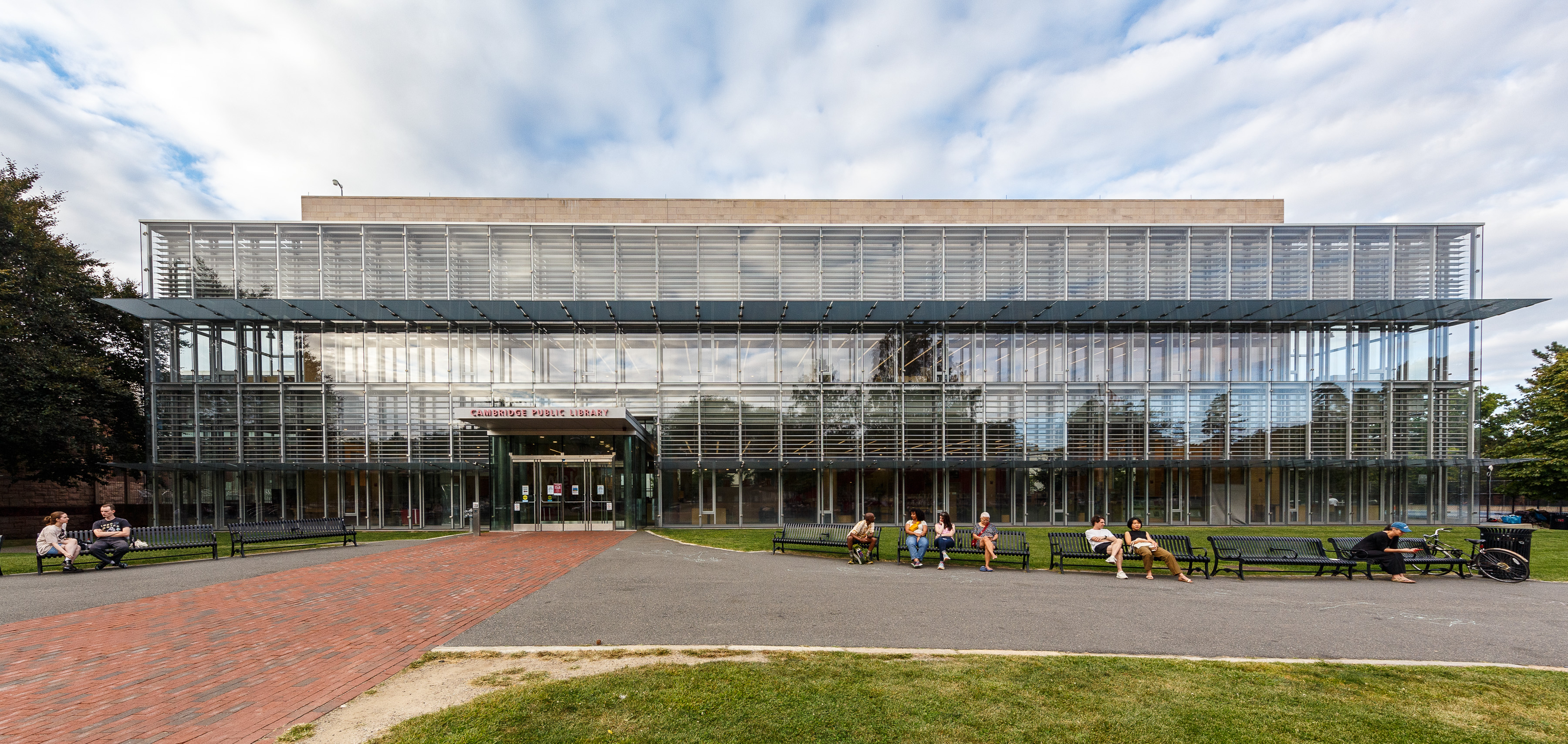
Main branch addition

The main library of the Cambridge Public Library consists of two buildings at 449 Broadway. The Van Brunt & Howe portion is a historic library building. It was built in 1888 with land and full construction funding donated by Frederick H. Rindge, a Cambridge native and philanthropist. Its Richardsonian Romanesque design was by Van Brunt & Howe. In the late 1960s, a more contemporary addition of plain brick exterior was created at the rear of the main library. The building was added to the National Register of Historic Places in 1982.

The newly expanded building consists of a $90 million expansion and renovation of the earlier library, led by the Boston architectural firms William Rawn Associates and Ann Beha Architects (now known as Annum Architects). The expanded library opened on November 8, 2009. The new addition more than tripled the square footage of the building and is the first building in the US to make use of European Double-Skin Curtainwall technology. Architectural drawings and construction photos were publicized through the process to the public. During most of the construction, the library collection had been relocated to the former Longfellow School building.

In 2010, the main library received a LEED Silver certification from the U.S. Green Building Council.

The surrounding park and lawn grounds of the Joan Lorentz Park found at the main building is a popular meeting place for various interest groups, including pickup soccer, slacklining, book and religious study groups, casual picnics, and the traditional practice of various martial and therapeutic arts. The main library and surrounding park sit at a top of a 70-car underground parking garage.

==== Building features and art works ====
===== Museum of Science Community Solar System =====
Prior to the renovation of the main library, the library was home to a scale model of the planet Saturn in the Boston Museum of Science's community-wide Solar System model. Saturn was located just outside the portion of the building that housed the old stacks, roughly where the computer workstation sign-in table is currently located. The Saturn model was packed up and shipped back to the Museum of Science and was not positioned at the reopened renovated library. Other locations in Cambridge that still have models in the historic nine planet series are the Royal Sonesta Hotel (home of Earth) and the CambridgeSide mall (home of Mars).

There are a further six smaller neighborhood branch libraries around the City of Cambridge:

Founded	Image	Location	Neighborhood served	Branch name	Notes
	*	45 Pearl St.	Cambridgeport (02139)	Central Square Branch	
1896	*	826 Cambridge St.	East Cambridge (02141)	Valente Branch	Built in 1896, rebuilt in 1961 as part of the Harrington Education Complex on the same site. Last rebuilt in 2019 as part of the King Open Education Complex.
*	*	48 Sixth St.	East Cambridge (02141)	O'Connell Branch	
1902	*	70 Rindge Ave.	North Cambridge (02140)	O'Neill Branch	
1936		64 Aberdeen Ave.	West Cambridge (02138)	Collins Branch	Has also been referred to as the "Mount Auburn" branch.
1989		245 Concord Ave.	West Cambridge (02138)	Boudreau Branch	Has also been referred to as the "Observatory Hill" branch.

== Governance & funding ==
The library system is governed by a board of trustees consisting of six volunteer trustees acting as community representative members appointed by the Cambridge City Manager. Meetings are held monthly on the first Tuesday. Meetings of the board are open to the public. The day-to-day oversight is by the Director of Libraries, who is supported further by managers at the separate neighborhood branches.

The system is funded primarily through property taxes as a department of the City of Cambridge, and receives additional support from the Cambridge Public Library Foundation and Friends of the Cambridge Public Library.

In fiscal year 2014, the city of Cambridge spent 1.63% ($7,064,381) of its city budget towards the library, amounting $66 per person.

== Collection(s) ==
As of 2023 card holders are offered extensive online resources.

== Awards and recognition ==
Awards
Award	Bestowing Organization
2015 National Honor Award for Architecture	American Institute of Architects (AIA)
2012 CNU Charter Award	Congress for the New Urbanism
2010 Harleston Parker Medal (photos of the award ceremony)	Boston Society of Architects
2010 Honor Award for Design Excellence	Boston Society of Architects
2010 Award for Interior Design/Interior Architecture	Boston Society of Architects
2010 Honor Award for Design Excellence	AIA New England
2010 Annual Design Review Award	ARCHITECT Magazine
2010 Preservation Award	Massachusetts Historical Commission
2010 Integrated Design/Integrated Development Award (IDID) for Excellence in Sustainable Design	New Hampshire AIA
2010 AGC Aon Build America Award	Associated General Contractors of America
One of the 10 Best Boston-Area Buildings of the Decade (2000-2010)	Boston Herald
2010 Library Design Showcase	American Libraries Magazine
2010 Citation for Innovative Envelope System	Sustainable Buildings Industry Council (SBIC) – Beyond Green High-Performance Building Awards

== Memberships ==
Academic and research library memberships for Cambridge Public Library include:

- Minuteman Library Network

== See also ==
- Historic Cambridge Newspaper Collection
- List of public libraries in Massachusetts
- National Register of Historic Places listings in Cambridge, Massachusetts
