= Queen Silvia Nursing Award =

Prize for nursing talent

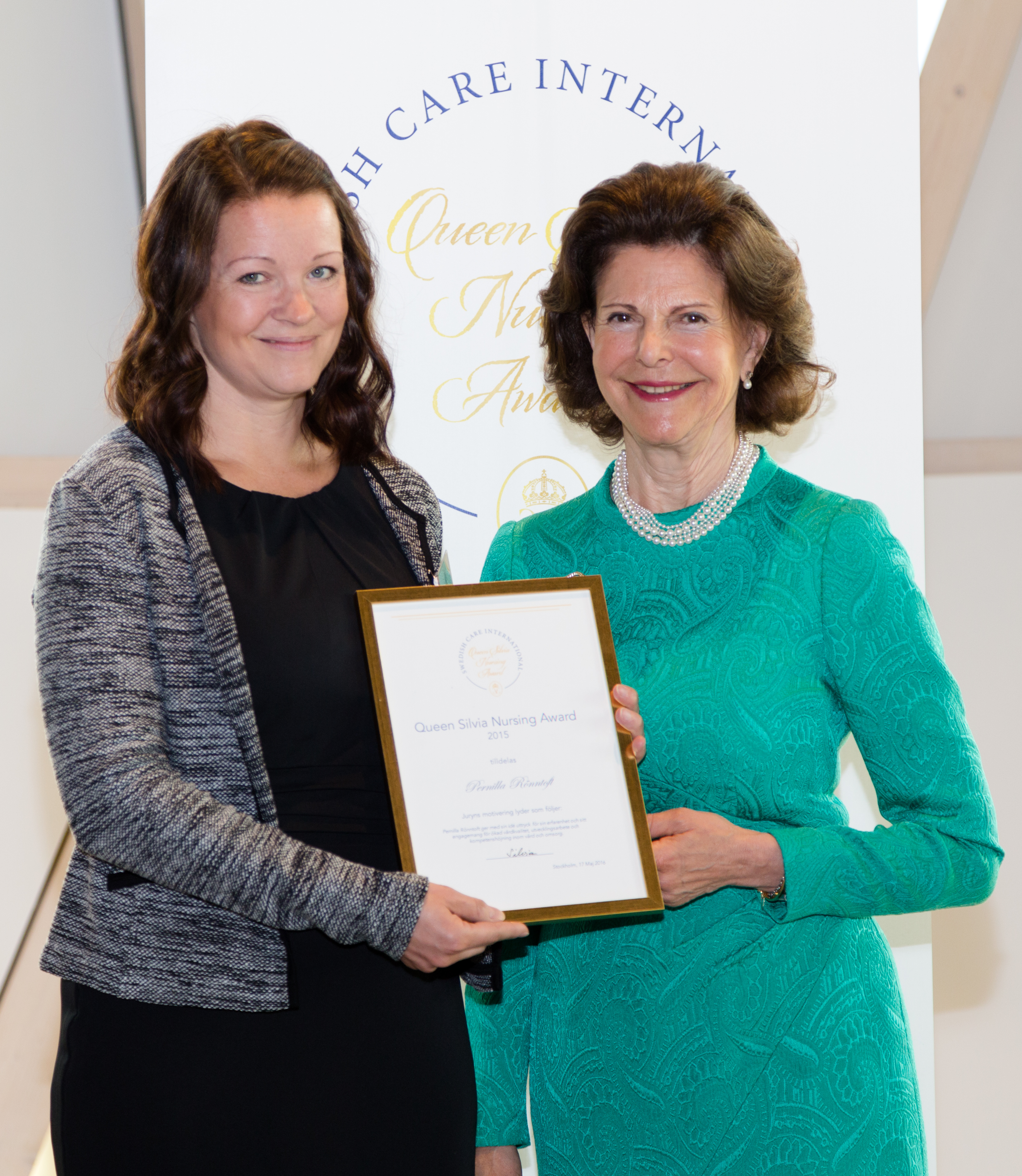
Queen Silvia with QSNA recipient from Sweden, Pernilla Rönntoft.

The Queen Silvia Nursing Award (QSNA) was a yearly prize for nursing talent that was established by Swedish Care International and Ideella föreningen Forum for Elderly Care.

It was active between 2012 and 2025.

The focus of the Award was to showcase new ideas and innovations stemming from nurses with the expressed mission to raise the quality of geriatric and cognitive / memory care.

Between 2012 and 2025, nurses and nursing students could apply for the Queen Silvia Nursing Award in network countries with their proposals to improve these two areas of care.

Winners received a 6000 Euro cash prize as well as international networking and learning opportunities with network partners.

The first Queen Silvia Nursing Award scholar was announced on 23 December 2013 to coincide with Her Majesty Queen Silvia of Sweden's 70th birthday.

As of December 2025, there are 62 Queen Silvia Nursing Award laureates in 7 countries.

The Queen Silvia Nursing Award closed with the final cycle of the competition in December 2025.

== Evolution ==
2013 - 2019: The Queen Silvia Nursing Award is open to nursing students

2020: In response to the WHO's Year of the Nurse as well as the start of the global pandemic, the Queen Silvia Nursing Award begins to receive applications from registered nurses in all participating countries

2022: Ahead of the Swedish government's protection of the undersköterska professional title on the 1 July 2023, the Queen Silvia Nursing Award opens a category for these healthcare talents in Sweden and Finland.

2024: Swedish municipalities are invited to nominate a nurse or undersköterska responsible for executed projects in elderly- and/or cognitive-care to highlight and inspire initiatives in the country.

2025: Finnish wellbeing service counties are invited to nominate a nurse or lähihoitaja responsible for executed projects in elderly - and/or cognitive-care to highlight and inspire initiatives in the country.

2025: The Queen Silvia Nursing Award closes.

== Recipients ==
Year	Award Recipients (Sweden)	Award Recipients (Finland)	Award Recipients (Poland)	Award Recipients (Germany)	Award Recipients (Lithuania)	Award Recipients (UWSON)	Award Recipients (Brazil)
2013	Hanna Davidsson	NA	NA	NA	NA	NA	NA
2014	Emilia Engman	Laura Virtanen	NA	NA	NA	NA	NA
2015	Pernilla Rönntoft	Elias Kallio	NA	NA	NA	NA	NA
2016	Saga Wahlström	Michelle Ena	Natalia Duszeńska	NA	NA	NA	NA
2017	Rebecca Eriksson	Katri Sajama	Aldona Reczek-Chachulska	Berit Ehmann	NA	NA	NA
2018	Sara Nyström	Maiju Björkqvist	Paulina Pergoł	Annette Löser	NA	NA	NA
2019	Maria Larsson	Janina Viitasaari	Agnieszka Napieralska	Sarina Bach	NA	NA	NA
2020	Lisabet Lindbäck	Inka Häkkinen	Radosław Romanek	Linda Smit	Karolina Adomavičiūtė	Brooke Tamble	NA
2021	Caroline Bjarnevi	Markus Suominen	Julia Osiecka	Stephan Wengel	Silvija Sutkuté	Michael Drake	Jean Singh
2022	Sara Rosenberg (sjuksköterskor/sjuksköterskestuderande) & Marie Svensson (undersköterskor/undersköterskestuderande)	Mia Kuusisto (sjuksköterskor/sjuksköterskestuderande) & Karoliina Tiura (undersköterskor/undersköterskestuderande)	Dominika Rachwał	Sonya Meyers	Giedrę Balčiūnienę	Juana Gallegos	Jussara Otaviano
2023	Stefan Krantz(sjuksköterskor/sjuksköterskestuderande) & Josefine Caesar(undersköterskor/undersköterskestuderande)	Floro Cubelo (sjuksköterskor/sjuksköterskestuderande) & Hanna Jokinen (undersköterskor/undersköterskestuderande)	Adrian Nowakowski	Paola Gava	Jurgita Stankūnienė	CJ Rivera	NA
2024	Catherine Emödi Berglund (sjuksköterskor/sjuksköterskestuderande) & Natalie Simander (undersköterskor/undersköterskestuderande)	Emma Sandberg	Aleksandra Kobza	Samira Pusch	Sonata Tomkevičienė	NA	NA
2025	Alma Fager (sjuksköterskor/sjuksköterskesutderande) & Linda Boo (undersköterskor/undersköterskestuderande)	Hanna Varpalahti	Anna Hepa-Banasik	El Hassania Bentajah	Gerda Bukauskaitė - Žiūkienė	NA	NA
