= NotchUp =

- Website type: Crowdsourced recruiting
- Available in: English
- Founded: 2008
- Headquarters: Palo Alto, California
- Founders: Jim Ambras; Rob Ellis
- Website: notchup.com
- Launched: 2008; 18 years ago
- Current status: Offline

NotchUp, Inc. was a Silicon Valley–based start-up that was first to offer an on-demand recruiting service that uses crowdsourcing combined with social media and an advanced web-based technology platform. NotchUp is a privately held company headquartered in Palo Alto, California.

The company's service is based on the premise that the best people are already employed, but are open to exploring opportunities that offer a better value proposition than their current job. NotchUp finds passive candidates for job postings using a crowdsourced group of independent contractors called Talent Scouts. NotchUp posts positions on their web site and the 2000+ Talent Scouts use NotchUp's proprietary software to match their personal and professional connections in social media such as LinkedIn, Facebook, MySpace and Twitter. Companies with job postings rate the candidates and either independently take the next steps or use NotchUp's services to make connections and do additional screening. Talent Scouts are then compensated based on how accurately they matched candidates to the position. It created what Bloomberg referred to as a "spam snowball."

The company was started in 2008 by co-founders Jim Ambras and Rob Ellis and initially offered a Pay for Interview service. It was listed by Business Insider as one of the “20 Hot Silicon Valley Startups You Need To Watch" in 2010. The company had seed funding from Floodgate, Nueva Ventures, and Steve Blank.

The company was later known as JobFlo. The company was last active on social media in 2018.

== Later History ==
The company later operated under the name JobFlo. In 2011 JobFlo founder and CEO Jim Ambras described JobFlo as the successor to NotchUp. Said that it provided a social-media-based recruiting platform for small and medium-sized businesses. The Notchup name is currently used by Future of Work Limited, a company registered in England and Wales. Its present-day platform provides digital-talent services and software for engineering management including AI-assisted recruiting, capacity planning, workforce management and engineering operations.

The current Notchup platform has introduced features since 2023, including AI-powered talent matching, conversational search, an AI co-pilot a career graph, a job aggregator and integrations, with Udemy and Coursera.[13]
