= Virtual volunteering =

Online volunteering

Virtual volunteering refers to volunteer activities completed, in whole or in part, using the Internet and a home, school buildings, telecenter, or work computer or other Internet-connected device, such as a smartphone or a tablet. Virtual volunteering is also known as online volunteering, remote volunteering or e-volunteering. Contributing to free and open source software projects or editing Wikipedia are examples of virtual volunteering.

== In practice ==
In one study, over 70 percent of online volunteers chose assignments requiring one to five hours a week and nearly half chose assignments lasting 12 weeks or less. Some organizations offer online volunteering opportunities which last from ten minutes to an hour. A unique feature of online volunteering is that it can be done from a distance. People with restricted mobility or other special needs participate in ways that might not be possible in traditional face-to-face volunteering. Likewise, online volunteering may allow people to overcome social inhibitions and social anxiety, particularly if they would normally experience disability-related labeling or stereotyping. This empowers people who might not otherwise volunteer. It can build self-confidence and self-esteem while enhancing skills and extending networks and social ties. Online volunteering also allows participants to adapt their program of volunteer work to their unique skills and passions.

People engaged in virtual volunteering undertake a variety of activities from locations remote to the organization or people they are assisting, via a computer or other Internet-connected device, such as:

- researching subjects (e.g. for Wikia projects)
- writing software (see open-source software which is often made by volunteers)
- fixing software (e.g. community patches)
- creating web pages
- editing or writing proposals, press releases, newsletter articles, etc.
- translating documents (e.g. fan translations)
- developing material for a curriculum
- designing a database
- designing graphics
- scanning documents
- providing legal, business, medical, agricultural or any other expertise
- counseling people
- tutoring or mentoring students
- moderating online discussion groups
- writing songs
- creating a podcast
- editing a video
- monitoring the news
- internet pastoral care
- answering questions
- tagging photos and files
- distributed computing
- managing other online volunteers

In the developing world, innovative synergies between volunteerism and technology typically focus on mobile communication technologies rather than the Internet. Around 26 per cent of people worldwide had Internet access in 2009. However, Internet penetration in low-income countries was only 18 per cent, compared to over 64 per cent in developed countries. While the costs of fixed broadband Internet are falling, access still remains unaffordable to many. Despite this, online volunteering is developing rapidly. Online volunteers are "people who commit their time and skills over the Internet, freely and without financial considerations, for the benefit of society." Online volunteering has eliminated the need for volunteerism to be tied to specific times and locations. Thus, it greatly increases the freedom and flexibility of volunteer engagement and complements the outreach and impact of volunteers serving in situ. Most online volunteers engage in operational and managerial activities such as fundraising, technological support, communications, marketing and consulting. Increasingly, they also engage in activities such as research and writing and leading e-mail discussion groups.

Online micro-volunteering is also an example of virtual volunteering and crowdsourcing, where volunteers undertake assignments via their smart devices . These volunteers either are not required to undergo any screening or training by the nonprofit for such tasks, and do not have to make any other commitment when a micro-task is completed, or, have already undergone screening or training by the nonprofit, and are therefore approved to take on micro-tasks as their availability and interests allow. Online micro-volunteering was originally called "byte-sized volunteering" by the Virtual Volunteering Project, and has always been a part of the more than 30-year-old practice of online volunteering. An early example of both micro-volunteering and crowdsourcing is ClickWorkers, a small NASA project begun in 2001 that engaged online volunteers in scientific-related tasks that required just a person's perception and common sense, but not scientific training, such as identifying craters on Mars in photos the project posted online; volunteers were not trained or screened before participating. The phrase "micro-volunteering" is usually credited to a San Francisco-based nonprofit called The Extraordinaries.

== Early history ==
The practice of virtual volunteering to benefit nonprofit initiatives dates back to at least the early 1970s, when Project Gutenberg began involving online volunteers to provide electronic versions of works in the public domain.

In 1995, a new nonprofit organization called Impact Online (now called VolunteerMatch), based in Palo Alto, California, began promoting the idea of "virtual volunteers". In 1996, Impact Online received a grant from the James Irvine Foundation to launch an initiative to research the practice of virtual volunteering and to promote the practice to nonprofit organizations in the US. This new initiative was dubbed the Virtual Volunteering Project, and the web site was launched in early 1997. After one year of operations, the Virtual Volunteering Project moved to the Charles A. Dana Center at The University of Texas at Austin. In 2002, the Virtual Volunteering Project moved within the university to the Lyndon B. Johnson School of Public Affairs. The first two years of the Virtual Volunteer Project were spent reviewing and adapting remote work manuals and existing volunteer management guidelines with regards to virtual volunteering, as well as identifying organizations that were involving online volunteers. By April 1999, almost 100 organizations had been identified by the Virtual Volunteering Project as involving online volunteers and were listed on the web site. Due to the growing numbers of nonprofit organizations, schools, government programs and other not-for-profit entities involving online volunteers, the Virtual Volunteering Project stopped listing every such organization involving online volunteers on its web site in 2000, and focused its efforts on promoting the practice, profiling organizations with large or unique online volunteering programs, and creating guidelines for the involvement of online volunteers. Until January 2001, the Virtual Volunteering Project listed all telementoring and teletutoring programs in the USA (programs where online volunteers mentor or tutor others, through a nonprofit organization or school). At that time, 40 were identified.

In August 1999, the NetAid.org initiative was launched. The initiative included an online volunteering component, today known as the UN Online Volunteering service. It went live in 2000 and has been managed by United Nations Volunteers since its inception. It quickly attracted a high number of people ready to support organizations working for development. In 2003, several thousand people already contributed to the UN's Online Volunteering service – volunteers with very diverse backgrounds, including university graduates, private sector employees, and retirees. While the UN's Online Volunteering service became independent, NetAid continued as a joint project of UNDP and Cisco Systems. It aimed "to utilize the unique networking capabilities of the Internet to promote development and alleviate extreme poverty across the world".

== Current state ==
Online volunteering has been adopted by thousands of nonprofit organizations and other initiatives. There is no organization currently tracking best practices in online volunteering in the USA or worldwide, how many people are engaged in online volunteering, or how many organizations utilize online volunteers, and studies regarding volunteering, such as reports on volunteering trends in the USA, rarely include information about online volunteering (for example, a search of the term virtual volunteering on the Corporation for National Service's "Volunteering in America" yields no results. On IVCO's Forum Discussion Paper 2015 it is recommended that a collective measurement tool developed as part of a global measurement framework should also capture online volunteering.

The UN's Online Volunteering service connects organizations working in or for the developing world with online volunteers. It does have statistics available regarding numbers of online volunteers and involving organizations (i.e. NGOs, other civil society organizations, a government or other public institutions, United Nations agencies or other intergovernmental institutions) that collaborate online via their platform. In 2013, all 17,370 online volunteering assignments offered by development organizations through the Online Volunteering service attracted applications from numerous qualified volunteers. About 58 percent of the 11,037 online volunteers were women, and 60 percent came from developing countries; on average, they were 30 years of age. More than 94 percent of organizations and online volunteers rated their collaboration as good or excellent in 2013. For civil society organizations with limited resources in particular, the impact of online volunteer engagement is significant: 41% involve UN Online Volunteers for technical expertise that is not available internally. According to the same impact evaluation carried out in 2014, in many instances, organizations without access to online volunteers would have difficulties achieving their own peace and development outcomes.

In July 2016, UNV unveiled a redesigned website and launched two additional services: The 1-click query to allow organizations to reach out to half a million people to provide real-time data for their projects, and its new employee online volunteering solution for global companies. Inclusive multi-stakeholder partnerships emerged as a necessity to achieve the Sustainable Development Goals (SDGs), and the first private sector partner of the Online Volunteering service is based in Brazil (Samsung Electronics Latin American Office).

Several other matching services, such as VolunteerMatch and Idealist, also offer virtual volunteering positions with nonprofit organizations in addition to traditional, on-site volunteering opportunities. VolunteerMatch currently reports that about 5 percent of its active volunteer listings are virtual in nature. As of June 2010, its directory included more than 2,770 such listings including roles in interactive marketing, fundraising, accounting, social media, and business mentoring. The percentage of virtual listings has dropped since 2006, when it peaked at close to 8 percent of overall volunteer opportunities in the VolunteerMatch system.

Wikipedia and other Wikimedia Foundation endeavors are examples of online volunteering, in the form of crowdsourcing or micro-volunteering; the majority of Wikipedia contributing volunteers are not required to undergo any screening or training by the nonprofit for their role as editors, and do not have to make a specific time commitment to the organization in order to contribute service.

Many organizations involved in virtual volunteering might never mention the term, or the words "online volunteer," on their web sites or in organizational literature. For example, the nonprofit organization Business Council for Peace (Bpeace) recruits business professionals to donate their time mentoring entrepreneurs in conflict-affected countries, including Afghanistan and Rwanda, but the majority of these volunteers interact with Bpeace staff and entrepreneurs online rather than face-to-face; yet, the term virtual volunteering is not mentioned on the web site. Bpeace also engages in online micro-volunteering, asking for information leads from its supporters, such as where to find online communities of particular professionals in the USA, but the organization never mentions the term micro-volunteering on its web site. Another example is the Electronic Emissary, one of the first K-12 online mentoring programs, launched in 1992; the web site does not use the phrase virtual volunteering and prefers to call online volunteers online subject-matter experts.

Rumie, an edtech non-profit organization also uses subject-matter experts, as well as corporate partners and leading non-profit organizations to create interactive learning modules centered on life skills and career development called Bytes. Rumie is an example of how virtual volunteering can offer an experience that is impactful on various levels. Rumie-Build, Rumie's microlearning authoring platform allows volunteers to work individually or in teams to create these Bytes. Filled with built-in guidance and prompts to support authors in creating quality content, real-time collaboration capabilities, and multimedia integration, Rumie-Build is the tool that facilitates a digital skills-based volunteer opportunity that feels effortless and fun, often helping volunteers develop their own knowledge in the process. The created Bytes are used by learners around the world to increase their skills, empowering them to achieve their full potential.

Evolving forms of volunteering will provide new opportunities for people to volunteer. The spread of technology connects increasingly rural and isolated areas. NGOs and governments are beginning to realise the value of South-to-South international volunteerism, as well as diaspora volunteering, and are dedicating resources to these schemes. Corporations are responding to the "social marketplace" by supporting CSR initiatives that include volunteerism. New opportunities for engaging in volunteerism are opening up with the result that more people are becoming involved and those already participating can increase their commitment. A phenomenon that is still quite new, but growing rapidly, is the formal integration of online employee volunteering programmes into the infrastructure and business plan of companies.

== See also ==
- Altruism
- Citizen science
- Zooniverse
- Community Notes
- Criticism of America Online regarding community leaders
- List of volunteer awards
- Slacktivism
- Social networking service
- Swarm intelligence
- Virtual assistant
- Virtual management
- Volunteer computing
