= Bpeace =

US-based non-profit organization

Bpeace (Business Council for Peace) is a not-for profit organization based in New York City, and founded in 2002. Bpeace operates under the slogan, "Bpeace believes the path to peace is lined with jobs." And that "More jobs means less violence." Bpeace works with entrepreneurs in conflict-affected countries to "scale their businesses, create significant employment for all, and expand the economic power of women." With an emphasis on advancing the role of women in business, Bpeace has reached the conflict-affected regions of Afghanistan, Rwanda and El Salvador.

== History ==
Toni Maloney is the co-founder of Bpeace and was its first CEO.

In 2012, the stated goal of Bpeace was "to create one million jobs across 1,000 communities. In each community these businesspeople become role models and strong voices for peace." As of 2026, Bpeace states that it "drives business growth that creates jobs, uplifts communities, and delivers real change for thousands of lives."

Bpeace gives preference to female business owners, but has expanded to help promising entrepreneurs of either gender.

Bpeace's methods are based on the concept that "The jobs that Fast Runners create have a multiplier effect – those jobs sustain thousands of families, boost local purchasing power, and in turn, strengthen other local businesses. This cycle of employment sets a once troubled community on the path to prosperity and peace."

== Donors, Partnerships, Recognition ==
Bpeace's primary donors include grassroots support members who pay dues, family foundations, and corporations such as Citibank and Microsoft.

The U.S. Department of State has been a steady supporter, partially funding Bpeace's work in Afghanistan since 2004.

The organization is affiliated with Goldman-Sachs' 10,000 Women Initiative.

Bpeace has earned the GuideStar Exchange Seal, demonstrating its commitment to transparency."

"55% of the entrepreneurs who have participated with Bpeace since 2004 are still engaged with Bpeace and in business, 100% of them are generating income and 93% are self-sustaining. 54% maintained employment levels and 32% posted job growth.

Forbes noted, "Business is a common language that not only transcends cultures, but can also break down the isolation of conflict-affected communities.Stronger businesses and innovation are powerful drivers for a country's peaceful future...Bpeace is ambitious—intent on creating one million jobs across 1,000 conflict-affected communities."

In October 2011, The Wall Street Journal reported on Afghan Fast-Runner Zarghuna's experiences while in the U.S. on BART. She was mentored at Bumble and Bumble on the intricacies of hair-styling. Bpeace board member, Laurie Chock said, "In Zarghuna, we saw the potential for growth...The fact that she does what she does, with the infrastructure issues and cultural restrictions, is almost magical."

The New York Times said, "Bpeace has graduated 56 high-potential entrepreneurs from its hands-on, three-year mentoring and skills-building program, while 117 women have completed 10,000 Women's management training, with the goal of reaching 300 women over five years… several indicators point to a growing number of female-led firms in Afghanistan. The international organization Peace Dividend Trust, which works with Afghan entrepreneurs to identify local market opportunities, now counts 242 women-owned companies in its national database of nearly 7,000 Afghan companies, with three to five new women-owned ventures joining its registry each month.

For The Washington Post, photojournalist Paula Lerner stated "The Afghan women I met in the Bpeace programs have, like many Afghans, witnessed decades of war and endured much tragedy in their lives. It is striking that despite all they have been through they have not been defeated by it. By building their businesses they are rebuilding their lives and their world. And in the process helping to rebuild their country as well."

CNN reported on two Bpeace Fast Runners in April 2011. Shahla and Fatima of Afghanistan travelled to the U.S. to tell their stories and inspire other women to follow their lead since at one time women could not even attend school in Afghanistan.

In May 2010 The Huffington Post reported on the Bpeace organized competition between entrepreneurs from Rwanda and Afghanistan, all trying to raise the most money for their business idea.

== Volunteer Engagement ==
Bpeace involves volunteers who are professionals from the business volunteers in mentoring entrepreneurs in the countries where it works. It calls these Skillanthropists. Bpeace volunteers must be monthly donors to be considered for engagement as Skillanthropists.

== Fast Running Around the World ==
In the conflict-affected regions in which Bpeace operates, Bpeace selects what they call "Fast Runners", or entrepreneurs/small business owners whose motivation and talent bring job creation and economic growth to entire communities. Bpeace states, "We significantly invest in [Fast Runners] because when successful, the employment these Fast Runners generate sparks a multiplier effect that sustains thousands of families and boosts local purchasing power, which in turn lifts other businesses, creates even more employment, opens new markets and accelerates the community up the path to prosperity and peace." Through a three-year mentoring program, experts are paired with a Fast Runner in the same business in order to advance the Fast Runner's productivity and achievement.

Afghanistan:

- Dosti Soccer Balls: a Bpeace supported joint-venture started by and employing women who hand-stitch soccer balls. These women work from their homes and support their families. The balls are marketed by Bpeace in the U.S. "Today, [DOSTI] collectively employs 475 Afghans…by stitching 500 soccer balls, or 1–2 balls per day, an Afghan woman can earn enough income from DOSTI to support a family of six for a year."
- BART: The Bpeace Apprentice Road Trip, sponsored in part by the U.S. Department of State, Bureau of Educational and Cultural Affairs, brought Afghan Fast Runners to the United States in June 2005, October 2008, October 2010 and October 2011 to learn the tricks of their respective trades. Furniture makers, IT entrepreneurs, beauty salon owners, construction contractors and salt processors are a few examples of Afghan entrepreneurs who have traveled to the U.S.

El Salvador: the most recent country in the Bpeace program. Janis Grover and Laura Rotter were Bpeace's First Traveling Mentors to El Salvador. They worked to improve productivity at a bakery, La Canasta, in 2011.

Rwanda: Examples of businesses in Rwanda that have been mentored through Bpeace include the country's first ice cream producer and shop, a hotel, funeral home, and landscaping business. In the Spring of 2011 Rwandan Fast Runners came to the U.S. on a BART.
