= Life (Cycle) of the Hong Kong Newt =

2024 Hong Kong documentary by Fung Hon-shing

- HKAFF poster
- Traditional Chinese: 一生螈命
- Jyutping: Jat^{1} Saang^{1} Jyun^{4} Ming^{6}
- Directed by: Fung Hon-shing
- Written by: Fung Hon-shing
- Cinematography: Daphne Wong; Dennis Ip; Fung Hon-shing; James Kwok
- Edited by: Fung Hon-shing
- Music by: Wong Hin-yan
- Production company: Frigatefilms
- Release date: 1 April 2024 (YouTube)
- Running time: 9 minutes
- Country: Hong Kong

Life (Cycle) of the Hong Kong Newt is a 2024 Hong Kong short nature documentary directed by local nature photographer Fung Hon-shing. The film documents the life cycle and survival threats faced by the Hong Kong newt (Paramesotriton hongkongensis), an endemic amphibian species. The work is also a key component of the "Life (Cycle) of the Hong Kong Newt" exhibition held in April 2024 at Parallel Space in Sham Shui Po. The exhibition covered various mediums including this documentary, photography, painting, and installation art, with the aim of raising public awareness of local biodiversity. The film was uploaded to YouTube in April 2024 for free public viewing.

== Synopsis ==
The film captures the full life process of the Hong Kong newt, from egg to adulthood, showcasing its natural behaviors such as courtship, egg-laying, and climbing. It also delves into the impact of urbanization on its habitat, particularly as urban development continues to reduce their living spaces. Every spring, the newts migrate from streams to higher forested areas for breeding. However, the greatest challenge they face during this migration is crossing roads. Thousands of newts must cross roads and highways, where they often fall victim to roadkill, leading to a significant number of deaths. This situation poses a severe threat to their survival.

== Production Background ==
Director Fung Hon-shing first became interested in documenting the life cycle of the Hong Kong newt during his time as a research assistant at the University of Hong Kong in 2018, where he studied the fungi Batrachochytrium dendrobatidis growing on the skin of amphibians. At the same time, Fung was one of the founders of the local nature production group Frigatefilms and had previously worked on projects like Wild Hong Kong and participated in the production of the RTHK program Biodiversity in Hong Kong (大自然大不同).

In late 2023, Fung launched a crowdfunding campaign that successfully raised over HKD 340,000. The filming team officially began their project at the end of 2022, exploring multiple newt habitats such as Fei Ngo Shan, Tai Mo Shan, Ho Chung, Lam Tsuen, and Mui Tsz Lam. Over the course of filming, they tracked 20 newts and documented their breeding, migration, and habitat conditions. The filming process lasted more than 40 days across different seasons to capture the complete life cycle of the newts, from egg to juvenile to adult. The team frequently ventured deep into the newts' habitats, carrying equipment while navigating challenging terrains. They used various advanced filming techniques, including diving with underwater cameras and scuba gear to film in freshwater streams, even staying underwater for long periods to minimize disturbance to the newts and capture their natural behavior. The team encountered several challenges, such as the fact that each oxygen tank only allowed for about 30 minutes of underwater filming.

After editing, the footage from over a year of filming was condensed into a 9-minute documentary. The film uses a no-narration approach, relying solely on visuals and music to convey emotions and themes. The music score was composed by Wong Hin-yan, a winner of the Golden Horse Award for Best Original Film Score.

== Naming ==
The Chinese title 一生螈命 was inspired by the Japanese term "Isshō Kenmei" (一生懸命), which originally means "to exert one's utmost effort in accomplishing something." It is often used to describe a wholehearted, all-in attitude. The documentary is not only a delicate portrayal of the complete life cycle of the Hong Kong newt but also reflects the director's personal commitment and persistence in wildlife conservation. The character "螈" (newt) in the title replaces "懸" (hanging), which not only references the main subject of the film—the Hong Kong newt—but also highlights the obstacles and dangers faced by local species in their struggle for survival.

== Exhibition and Conservation ==
To promote ecological conservation and public education, Fung Hon-shing initiated a crowdfunding campaign at the end of 2023, with a goal of HKD 320,000, and ultimately raised HKD 340,000. The funds were used not only for the exhibition and documentary production but also to support the "Hong Kong Newt Roadkill Survey Program," led by a scientific team from Lingnan University. This program is Hong Kong's first wildlife conservation project combining art, science, and public participation. Director Fung expressed his special gratitude to the 520 crowdfunding supporters, emphasizing that without public involvement, the project would not have come to life.

The exhibition "Life (Cycle) of the Hong Kong Newt" was held from 5 to 14 April 2024 at Parallel Space in Sham Shui Po. The exhibition showcased this documentary, newt body specimens from roadkill, photography works, ecological illustrations, and more, creating an immersive space for the audience to confront life and death. The participating creators included Fung Hon-shing, ecological photographers and documentary filmmakers James Kwok, art creator Daphine Wong, and scientific illustrators focused on nature themes Nicole Kit.

Fung hopes to raise public awareness of the survival threats faced by the Hong Kong newt, particularly the roadkill issue encountered during their annual spring migration. He calls on the government and various sectors of society to implement more practical conservation measures, including the establishment of wildlife corridors, protective barriers, volunteer-guided crossings, and road closures during breeding seasons, to reduce the direct harm caused by vehicles to the newts.

== Reception ==
- 2024 Earth In Focus Singapore Nature Film Festival (Winner of 2024 Nature Film of The Year)
- 2024 Hong Kong Asian Film Festival (Official Selection)
- 2024 Jackson Wild Media Awards (Official Selection)
- 2025 The 48th International Wildlife Film Festiva (Official Selection)
