= Smithsonian Transcription Center =

- Website type: Transcription Citizen science
- Available in: English
- Owner: Smithsonian Institution
- Creator: Smithsonian Institution
- Website: transcription.si.edu
- Commercial: No
- Registration: Optional
- Launched: 12 August 2014; 12 years ago
- Current status: Online

The Smithsonian Transcription Center is a crowdsourcing transcription project that aims to assist with the preservation and digitization of handwritten material in the Smithsonian Institution. The Transcription Center cites five reasons why transcription matters: discovery, humanities research, scientific research, education, and readability. Collections available for transcription include such documents as scientist field notebooks, artist diaries, astronomy logbooks, botany and bumblebee specimens and certified currency proofs.

The Smithsonian Transcription Center began in June 2013 and spent approximately a year in a beta test phase. On 12 August 2014 the Transcription Center website was launched to the public. As well as transcribing, volunteers review the submitted work before it is sent for approval. The final transcription is then checked by Smithsonian staff and once accepted, both the original images of the work and the transcription are kept on line.

The Transcriptions Center has an open call for anyone wanting to join in on transcribing documents for their many projects. Researches, educators, history buffs, amateur social scientists, and citizens are welcome to volunteer to transcribe for any of the many projects. The Transcription Center hopes that it will engage the public by making the Smithsonian Institution collections accessible.
