= Student of Fortune =

Online tutoring company

- Website type: Internet Online tutoring
- Available in: English
- Commercial: Yes
- Current status: Inactive

Student of Fortune was a United States–based company that provided an online tutoring marketplace.

In an interview with The Daily Trojan, McCleese described the way the company's site operated as being similar to eBay. The company's site did not offer direct tutoring services, instead offering a channel to connect tutors and students. Student of Fortune was located in Los Angeles, California, and was privately held, having taken no outside investment funds. The firm was acquired by Chegg on August 19, 2011. On July 15, 2013, Chegg announced that it would close down studentoffortune.com on August 15, 2013.

== History and inspiration ==
Student of Fortune was inspired by Sean McCleese's experience in a senior-level quantum physics class at Occidental College. He says, "...here were ten people in the class. Homework was due every day or two, and since it was a senior level class, I couldn't find a person who could help me, because they had all graduated. One homework assignment, I particularly remember, no one in the class could figure out how to do." Finding that other online tutoring sites did not address his classmates' needs, McCleese decided to form Student of Fortune—to provide a source for students to get homework help and earn money helping others.

== Controversy ==
The site was involved in a breach of personal medical information when a file from a medical collections' contractor was posted with a question asking how to create bar graphs. The upload occurred September 9, 2010, and was reported by a patient on August 22, 2011, almost a year later. It included information on 20,000 patients of the Stanford Hospital emergency room between March 1, 2009, and August 31, 2009. A class action lawsuit was filed against Stanford Medical Group and Multi-Specialty Collection Services LLC for $20 million.
