= Sightsmap =

Sightseeing popularity heatmap overlaid on Google Maps

Sightsmap was a sightseeing popularity heatmap overlaid on Google Maps, based on crowdsourcing: the number of Panoramio photos taken at each place in the world.

The goal of the site is to find and explore places interesting for tourism and sightseeing. The most popular places are shown on the map with an appropriate crowd-sourced name, attached links, tagcloud and colour-coded markers in the order of the relative popularity in the currently visible map area.

Users can filter popular places by their estimated population, type and tags. The site offers also tools for travel planning, adding bookmarks and personal notes to places.

The place names are selected by the Wikipedia readership numbers and Foursquare checkins, augmented using the automated analysis of photo titles. A tag cloud of weighted categories is computed from the photo titles and attached to a place.

The data sources have been harvested using public web API-s (Panoramio and Foursquare) or downloaded in the already converted semantic format: Wikipedia downloaded in the form of the DBpedia RDF database, complemented with the Wikipedia public logfiles, and the Geonames database.

The site was created in 2012 by Tanel Tammet, with significant contributions in 2012 and 2013 by Priit Järv and Ago Luberg.
