= Historic Cambridge Newspaper Collection =

Digital library

The Historic Cambridge Newspaper Collection is a freely available, keyword searchable archive of four Cambridge, Massachusetts newspapers. The collection includes editions that are in the public domain. The Collection is a project of the Cambridge Room, the Archives and Special Collections of the Cambridge Public Library, and is supported by funding from the Community Preservation Act. In excess of 650,000 articles are available.

== Mechanism ==
The newspapers are scanned and OCRd. Both images and OCR are made available, registered members may correct the OCR.

== Papers covered ==
- Cambridge Chronicle (1846-1923)
- Cambridge Press (1887-1889)
- Cambridge Sentinel (1903-1912)
- Cambridge Tribune (1887-1923)
