= Clickworkers =

Citizen science project by NASA

ClickWorkers was a small NASA experimental project that uses public volunteers (nicknamed "clickworkers" on the site) for scientific tasks. Clickworkers are able to work when, and for however long they choose, doing routine analysis that would normally require months of work by scientists or graduate students. The web site and database were created and maintained by one engineer, Bob Kanefsky, and advised by two scientists, Nadine Barlow and Virginia Gulick. The pilot study was sponsored by the NASA Ames Director's Discretionary Fund.

As of March 31, 2020, the Clickworkers volunteer program appears to be defunct. None of the links to the program are functional, as of that date.

== Identifying Martian craters ==
The original phase ran from November 2000 to September 2001, identifying and classifying the age of craters on Mars images from Viking Orbiter that had already been analyzed by NASA. The goal was to answer two meta-science questions:

1. Is the public ready, willing, and able to help science?
2. Does this new way of powering science analysis produce results that are just as good as the traditional way?

In February 2001 clickworkers started processing new images from Mars Global Surveyor, surveying small craters never before cataloged. Clickworkers also searched Mars images for "honeycomb" terrain, although no further images were discovered and it is suspected that this is an illusory feature type. Their analysis might potentially be useful for scientists, although there are no specific plans for using it yet.

As of 2007, new beta tasks were up on the Clickworker site. This time workers were being asked to help catalog Mars landforms in one of two ways. In the first task, high resolution images from the HiRISE camera on the Mars Reconnaissance Orbiter are displayed and the volunteers are to stamp areas on the image with appropriate landform types. The second task took a different approach and displayed wider field views from the older MOC camera on Mars Global Surveyor. The landforms on these wider views were then marked, and interesting features could be tagged for possible future hi-res imaging with HiRISE.

== New site ==
In November 2009 it was announced that NASA has developed a new website to allow volunteer users to help in Martian mapping. The site "Be a Martian" went live on November 17, 2009, and allows users to either map features or count craters on Mars. As of March 2020, the "Be a Martian" website appears to be defunct.

== See also ==
- Virtual volunteering
