= Arrange to Settle =

- Directed by: Ishu Krishna
- Produced by: Annie Cull; Sweta Mehta; Suresh Mulakal; Nishi Kothari; Naina Juliet Joseph; Chris Emerson; Jason Baustin; Aaron Lasher; Karen Dadey; Pramodh Sunkari
- Starring: Priya Jagadeesh; Beau Peregino; Ravi Khanna; Susannah Wells; Nayab Hussain
- Release date: 7 June 2012
- Country: United States
- Language: English

Arrange to Settle is a comedy-drama film written and directed by Ishu Krishna and starring Priya Jagadeesh, Beau Peregino, Ravi Khanna, Susannah Wells, and Nayab Hussain. The plot is about an American-born Indian woman who has to decide between an arranged marriage and another love. The film was shot in 2011 in and around Washington, D.C., and was completed in the end of 2012. Krishna received initial funding and marketing by using crowd funding platforms.

== Plot ==
During the opening credits there is a montage of many men Jyothi dates depicted through one date. There will be natural wipes, which change her date from one guy to another, and the changing of seasons will depict the time passing. Lyle wakes up in bed with Jyothi and breaks up with her.

During the weekly dinner with her parents, Jyothis mother hassles her about marriage again. She gives her a hard time about being 30 now and single. She asks her if she can find someone for her. To her surprise, Jyothi says, yes. Her mother gets very excited and tells Jyothis father that he is her witness.

Melanie meets Adam at Kickball. Adam and Melanie start a side love story. The girls are heavily involved in the kickball sub-culture, and their different personalities are revealed here.

Jyothis mother posts her profile on the matrimonial website and starts screening men for her. Jyothi has conversations with these men and some are very comical. She finally talks to a guy, Vimal that seems decent. They agree to go out. He asks her to pick the place to go, and tells her that he will meet her there.

During her date, there is good conversation, but no chemistry. When the bill arrives, she goes for the reach and he lets her pay for half. She seems disappointed. Jyothi goes out with Vimal a few more times and the same pattern continues and there is no chemistry yet. Vimal asks her to marry him after 5 dates and she agrees.

Before they make the announcement, her father gives her the opportunity to back out of the wedding. He explains to her that after the invitations go out, that it would bring shame to her family if she backed out. Jyothi confirms that her decision is final. Her parents get very excited and start planning the wedding and invite a 1000 people.

When she is out with her girls the man of her dreams, Justin, hits on her. There is instant chemistry. They chat, but she has to leave with Melanie who decides to leave for the night with a hook-up.

He has a secret date planned for her since she tells him she is obsessed with Top Chef, takes her to Mike Isabella from Top Chef season six and all-stars new restaurant Graffiato. She has a blast with him and when the check comes he grabs it instantly and pays for the entire thing.

She continues to go out with both men. She never tells Justin about her upcoming marriage, because she is confused on what to do. If she breaks the marriage off, Justin might break her heart. If she breaks the marriage then she will be shunned by the Indian community and her family and will probably not have an opportunity to have an arranged marriage again.

Preetha and her husband Sid progress in their relationship throughout the film. They get pregnant, and Preetha quits the kickball team and her lifestyle of partying. Melanie drinks more and more and her life gets consumed by random hook-ups and she ends up losing her job due to her lifestyle. Jyothi sees two potential ways her life could go and is at a cross-road.

Jyothi tells Justin about her impending marriage, he tells her to just break it off. He doesn't seem to understand how hard it would be for her to do that. Justin comes around and tries to get Jyothi back. Who will Jyothi pick?

== Marketing ==
A big portion of the press for this film was received due to director Ishu Krishna's usage of crowdfunding to pay for its production. Krishna spoke at a TIVA event about crowdfunding. There were two blogs and an article in the Indian Express that used Arrange to Settle as a case study for crowdfunding.

Ishu Krishna also had several radio interviews about the film with Naan Sense Radio and Bangla Radio.
