= Design studies =

Academic field

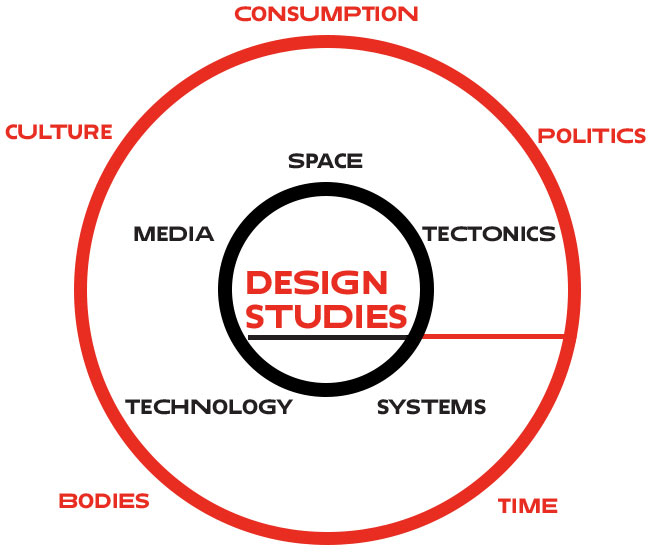
This image describes the matrix of design studies. The inner circle describes the subject(s) of design, the outer, its context.

Design studies can refer to any design-oriented studies but is more formally an academic discipline or field of study that pursues, through both theoretical and practical modes of inquiry, a critical understanding of design practice and its effects in society.

== Characteristics and scope ==
Design studies encompasses the study of both the internal practices of design and the external effects that design activity has on society, culture and the environment. Susan Yelavich explained design studies as embracing "two broad perspectives—one that focuses inward on the nature of design and one that looks outward to the circumstances that shape it, and conversely, the circumstances design changes, intentionally or not". This dual aspect is reflected in the complementary orientations of the two leading journals in the field. Design Studies (established 1979) is "the interdisciplinary journal of design research" and is "focused on developing understanding of design processes". Design Issues (established 1984) "examines design history, theory, and criticism" and "provokes inquiry into the cultural and intellectual issues surrounding design".

An interdisciplinary field, design studies includes many scholarship paradigms and uses an evolving set of methodologies and theories drawn from key thinkers from within the field itself. The field has connections with the humanities, the social sciences and the sciences, but many scholars regard design itself as a distinct discipline.

Design studies scholars recognize that design, as a practice, is only one facet of much larger circumstances. They examine and question the role of design in shaping past and present personal and cultural values, especially in light of how they shape the future.

The extensive scope of design studies is conveyed in two collected sets of readings: Design Studies: A Reader (2009) is a compilation of extracts from classic writings that laid the foundations of the field, and The Routledge Companion to Design Studies (2016) contains newer writings over a wide range of topics such as gender and sexuality, consumerism and responsibility, globalization and post-colonialism.

== History ==
=== Origins and early development ===
The origins of design studies lie in the rapid expansion of issues and topics around design since the 1960s, including its role as an academic discipline, its relationships with technological and social change, and its cultural and environmental impacts. As a field of studies it developed more specifically in the development of interaction between design history and design research. Debates about the role of design history and the nature of design research from the 1970s and 80s were brought together in 1992 when Victor Margolin argued in the journal Design Studies for the incorporation of design history into design research, in a combined approach to the study of design. Margolin noted the "dynamic crossings of intellectual boundaries" when considering developments in both fields at the time, and defined design studies as "that field of inquiry which addresses questions of how we make and use products in our daily lives and how we have done so in the past".

Margolin's argument triggered counterarguments and other suggestions about what constitutes design history and how to characterize the study of design as something more than a professional practice. In a reply to Margolin in the Journal of Design History in 1993, Adrian Forty argued that design history had consistently performed a vital role in examining questions around quality in design and was already embracing new lines of thought, for example from cultural studies and anthropology. The growing debate led to a special issue of the journal Design Issues in 1995 which focused attention on "some of the controversies and problems that surround the seemingly simple task of telling the history of design".

A shift from design history towards design studies continued to develop as the overlapping research methods and approaches to the study of design began to lead to broader questions of meaning, authority and power. The realization came that design history is only "but one component of what goes on in studying design, and to claim that all that is going on now could use the umbrella term 'design history' is not tenable".

=== Foundational figures ===
Reyner Banham (1922–1988)
Banham's Theory and Design in the First Machine Age and his journalistic articles written for New Society have been described by the British writer and design historian Penny Sparke as representing a major "shift in how material culture was seen. His writing focused on popular commodities as well as formal architecture.

Gui Bonsiepe (born 1934)
Bonsiepe is a German designer and professor for various universities including FH Koln; Carnegie Mellon; EUA, Chile; LBDI/FIESC, Brazil; Jan van Eyck Academy, Netherlands. His most influential work is Design and Democracy.

Richard Buchanan
American professor of design, management, and information systems and editor of the journal Design Issues. He is well known for "extending the application of design into new areas of theory and practice, writing, and teaching as well as practicing the concepts and methods of interaction design." As a co-editor of Discovering Design: Explorations in Design Studies with Victor Margolin, he brought together the fields of psychology, sociology, political theory, technology studies, rhetoric, and philosophy.

Nigel Cross (born 1942)
Cross is a British academic, design researcher and educator who has focused on design's intellectual space in the academic sphere. He is an emeritus professor of design studies in the Department of Design and Innovation, Faculty of Technology, at the UK's Open University, and emeritus editor-in-chief of Design Studies, the international journal of design research. In his 1982 journal article "Designerly Ways of Knowing" in Design Studies, Cross argued that design has its own intellectual and practical culture as a basis for education, contrasting it with cultures of science and arts and humanities.

Clive Dilnot
Originally educated as a fine artist, Dilnot later began studying social philosophy and the sociology of culture with Polish sociologist Zygmunt Bauman. Dilnot has worked on the history, theory, and criticism of the visual arts in their broadest terms. His teaching and writing have focused on design history, photography, criticism, and theory. Dilnot studied ethics in relation to design, and the role of design's capabilities in creating a humane world in his book, Ethics? Design? published in 2005.

Adrian Forty (born 1948)
Forty was Professor of Architectural History at The Bartlett, The Faculty of the Built Environment at University College London. Forty believed that the drive to define a new field, the field of design studies, was unnecessary due to the fact that the field of design history had not exhausted all of its possibilities. His book Objects of Desire explores how consumer goods relate to larger issues of social processes.

Tony Fry
Fry is a British design theorist and philosopher who writes on the relationship between design, unsustainability, and politics. Fry has taught design and cultural theory in Britain, the United States, Hong Kong and Australia. He is perhaps best known for his writing on defuturing, the destruction of the future by design.

John Heskett (1937–2014)
In the late 1970s, Heskett became a prominent member of a group of academics based in several of Britain's art schools (then part of the polytechnics) who helped develop the discipline of design history and theory, later to become subsumed under the broader banner of design studies. Heskett brought his deep knowledge of economics, politics and history to the project and worked alongside scholars from other disciplines to communicate the meaning and function of that increasingly important concept, 'design', both past and present.

Victor Margolin (1941–2019)
Considered one of the founders of design studies, Victor Margolin was professor emeritus of design history at the University of Illinois, Chicago. He was a co-editor of the academic design journal, Design Issues, and the author, editor, or co-editor of a number of books including Design Discourse, Discovering Design, The Idea of Design, The Designed World, and The Politics of the Artificial.

Victor Papanek (1923–1998)
An industrial designer, Papanek suggested that industrial design had lethal effects by virtue of creating new species of permanent garbage and by choosing materials and processes that pollute the air. His writing and teaching were consistently in favour of re-focusing design for the general good of humanity and the environment.

Elizabeth Sanders
As a practitioner, Sanders introduced many of the methods being used today to drive design from a human-centered perspective. She has practiced participatory design research within and between all the design disciplines. Her current research focuses on codesign processes for innovation, intervention, and transdisciplinary collaboration.

Penny Sparke
Sparke is a professor of design history and director of the Modern Interiors Research Centre (MIRC) at Kingston University, London. Along with Fiona Fisher, Sparke co-edited The Routledge Companion to Design Studies, a comprehensive collection of essays embracing the wide range of scholarship relating to design—theoretical, practice-related, and historical.

== Issues and concepts ==
Design studies inquires about the meanings and consequences of design. It studies the influence of designers and the effects design has on citizens and the environment. Victor Margolin distinguishes a degree in design from a degree in design studies by saying that "the former is about producing design, while the latter is about reflecting on design as it has been practiced, is currently practiced, and how it might be practiced".

Design studies urges a rethinking of design as a process, as a practice, and as a generator or products and systems that gives lives meaning and is imbricated in our economic and political systems. The study of design thinking explores the complexities inherent in the task of thinking about design. Design studies is also concerned with the relationship between design and gender, design and race, and design and culture. It studies design as ethics, its role in sustainability (social and environmental), and the nature of agency in design's construction the artificial.

=== Issues ===
==== Ethics ====
Design has the capacity of structuring life in certain ways and thus design should result in greater good for individuals and society but it doesn't always do so. Ethics deals with how our actions affect others and should affect others. Design studies sees ethics as central to design. Tony Fry, a leading figure in design studies, said that it is widely recognized that design is an ethical process but remains underdeveloped and marginal within design education.

Clive Dilnot's essay "Ethics in Design: Ten Questions" explores the relationship between design and ethics and why we need ethics in design. Dilnot discussed the ability of the designer to address the public as citizens and not as consumers, and about infusing "humane intelligence" into the made environment.

=== Concepts ===
==== The artificial ====
Clive Dilnot wrote that the artificial is by no means confined to technology. Today, it is combination of technical systems, the symbolic realm, including mind and the realm of human transformations and transmutations of nature. He gave the example of a genetically modified tomato that is neither purely natural nor purely artificial. It belongs rather to the extended realms of living things that are, as human beings ourselves are, a hybrid between these conditions.

Design studies scholars also reference sociologist Bruno Latour when investigating the dynamics of the artificial. Latour's concept of actor–network theory (ANT) portrays the social as an interdependent network of human individual actors and non-human, non-individual entities called actants.

==== Agency ====
Design plays a constitutive role in everyday life. The things people see and read, the objects they use, and the places they inhabit are all designed. These products (all artificial because they are made by people) constitute an increasingly large part of the world. The built environment is the physical infrastructure that enables behavior, activity, routines, habits, and rituals, which affect our agency. Jamer Hunt defined the built environment as the combination of all design work.

=== Decolonizing design ===
There have been protests that the field of design studies is not sufficiently "geared towards delivering the kinds of knowledge and understanding that are adequate to addressing the systemic problems that arise from the coloniality of power". Moves towards decolonizing design entail changing design discourse from within by challenging and critiquing the dominant status quo from spaces where marginal voices can be heard, by educating designers about the politics of what they do and create, and by posing alternatives to current (colonial) design practices, rooted in the contexts and histories of the Global South rather than just the North.

The argument is that design history and design research tend to have the strongest influences from the triad of Western Europe, North America, and Japan. The effect tends to be in line with the notion that history is written by the victors and thus design history is written by the economically powerful. Denise Whitehouse said, "While many countries produce local histories of design, the output is uneven and often driven by nationalist and trade agendas", although some academic groups such as the Japanese Design History Forum and the International Committee for Design History and Studies (ICDHS) attempt to draw together both western and non-western, post-communist, postcolonial, Asian, and Southern Hemisphere approaches, "to remap the scope and narrative concerns of design history". A special issue of the Design and Culture journal (Volume 10, Issue 1, 2018) was published on the topic of decolonizing design.

== Research methods ==
The following are some of the research methods that may be used in design studies.

=== Design ethnography ===
This form of research requires the scholar to partake in the use of, or observe others use, a designed object or system. Design ethnography has become a common tool where design is observed as a social practice. It describes a process in which a researcher will partake in traditional observant style ethnography, and observe potential users complete activities that can inform design opportunities and solutions. Other ethnographic techniques used by design studies scholars would fall more in line with anthropologists usage of the method. These techniques are observant and participant ethnography. The observant style requires the scholar to observe in an unobtrusive manner. Observations are recorded and further analyzed. The participant style requires the scholar to partake in the activities with their subject. This tactic enables the scholar to record what they see, but also what they themselves experience.

Design ethnography emerged out of a movement in the late 1980s by organizations such as Xerox/PARC (Palo Alto Research Center], Institute for Research on Learning and Jay Doblin & Associates toward social science approaches in their product design and development efforts. In the 1990s, the research and design consultancy E-Lab (founded by former Doblin employees) took this approach further, pioneering a multidisciplinary methodology guided by anthropology and ethnography. E-Lab challenged conventional market research by prioritizing real-world user experiences and behaviors uncovered through fieldwork, then analyzing the data for patterns organized by explanatory frameworks.

=== Actor-network theory ===
While it remains a broader theory or concept, actor-network theory can be used by design studies scholars as a research framework. When using this method, scholars will assess a designed object and consider the physical and nonphysical interactions which revolve around the object. The scholar will analyze what the object's impact is on psychological, societal, economical, and political worlds. This widened viewpoint allows the researcher to explore and map out the objects many interactions, identify its role within the network, and in what ways it is connected to stakeholders.

=== Semiotics, rhetorical analysis, and discourse theory ===
Design studies scholars may also analyze or research a designed object or system by studying it in terms of representations and their various meanings. Semiotics studies acts of communication between the designer, the thing, and the user or users. This concept branches out into a rhetorical analysis of the designed thing. Scholars such as Richard Buchanan argue that design can be studied in such a way due to the existence of a design argument. The design argument is made up by the designer, the user, and the applicability to "practical life". The scholar would pull these segments apart and thoroughly analyze each component and their interactions. Discourse analysis and Foucauldian discourse analysis can be adopted by the design studies scholar to further explore the above components. A Foucauldian approach specifically will analyze the power structures put in place, manipulated by, or used within a designed thing or object. This process can be particularly useful when the scholar intends to understand if the designed thing has agency or enables others to have agency.

== Societies ==
The Design Research Society (DRS) is a learned society committed to promoting and developing design research. It is the longest established, multi-disciplinary worldwide society for the design research community, founded in the UK in 1966. The purpose of the DRS is to promote "the study of and research into the process of designing in all its many fields".

The Design History Society is an organization that promotes the study of global design histories, and brings together and supports all those engaged in the subject—students, researchers, educators, designers, designer-makers, critics, and curators. The Society aims to play an important role in shaping an inclusive design history.
