= Cheryl Buckley =

British design historian

Cheryl Buckley (born 1956) is a British design historian whose research has focused on feminist approaches to design history. She has published on British ceramic design and fashion. Her works include the influential article "Made in Patriarchy: Toward a Feminist Analysis of Women and Design" (1986) and the books Potters and Paintresses (1990) and Designing Modern Britain (2007). She was professor of fashion and design history at the University of Brighton from 2013 to 2021, and was previously professor of design history at Northumbria University. In 2021, she was made Professor Emerita at the University of Brighton.

== Education and career ==
Buckley attended the University of East Anglia, gaining a degree in history of art and architecture (1977). She received a master's degree in design history from Newcastle University (1982). She returned to the University of East Anglia for her PhD in design history, awarded in 1991. She worked from 1980 at Newcastle Polytechnic in Newcastle-upon-Tyne, renamed Northumbria University in 1992, latterly as professor of design history, before joining the University of Brighton in 2013, where she is professor of fashion and design history. In 2017, she and Jeremy Aynsley established the Centre for Design History at Brighton.

In 2000, she co-founded the journal Visual Culture in Britain. She chaired the Design History Society (2006–09) and served as editor-in-chief of its journal, the Journal of Design History (2011–16).

== Research and writings ==
Buckley states her current research interests as gender and design, and has been described as a feminist design historian. She has published on ceramic design and fashion, focusing on Britain from the mid-Victorian era to the present day. Her article "Made in Patriarchy: Toward a Feminist Analysis of Women and Design", published in Design Issues in 1986, opens:

Women have been involved with design in a variety of ways – as practitioners, theorists, consumers, historians, and as objects of representation. Yet a survey of the literature of design history, theory, and practice would lead one to believe otherwise. Women's interventions, both past and present, are consistently ignored. Indeed, the omissions are so overwhelming, and the rare acknowledgment so cursory and marginalized, that one realizes these silences are not accidental and haphazard; rather, they are the direct consequence of specific historiographic methods.

In the article, described as "seminal" by Victor Margolin and "ground-breaking" by Grace Lees-Maffei, Buckley teases out design contributions made by women, and suggests that craft arts have been ignored in the study of design history.

In her first book, Potters and Paintresses: Women Designers in the Pottery Industry, 1870–1955 (1990), Buckley discusses the participation of women in ceramic design during this period.

In Fashioning the Feminine: Representation and Women's Fashion from the Fin de Siècle to the Present (2002), Buckley and co-author Hilary Fawcett review fashion in Britain from 1890, highlighting its interaction with both feminism and femininity as well as its "paradoxical" relationship with modernity. More recently, Buckley co-authored Fashion and Everyday Life: London and New York with Hazel Clark (2017).

In her second sole-authored book, Designing Modern Britain (2007), Buckley surveys British design between 1890 and 2001, broadly chronologically via numerous case studies. She employs a broad definition of design, which she considers "a matrix of interdependent practices", encompassing architecture, town planning, interior design, pottery, textiles, and fashion.

In 2025, Made in Patriarchy, Cheryl Buckley was published with a foreword by Bibiana Oliveira Serpa and edited by Nina Paim was published by Bikini Books.

== Selected publications ==
Books

Cheryl Buckley, Made in Patriarchy, Cheryl Buckley ,foreword by Bibiana Oliveira Serpa ,edited by Nina Paim, published by Bikini Books, 2025, ISBN 978-989-35859-2-4.

- Cheryl Buckley; Hazel Clark (2017), Fashion and Everyday Life: London and New York, Bloomsbury Academic, ISBN 978-1-84788-959-1
- Cheryl Buckley (2007), Designing Modern Britain, Reaktion, OCLC 77797449
- Cheryl Buckley; Hilary Fawcett (2002), Fashioning the Feminine: Representation and Women's Fashion from the Fin de Siècle to the Present, I.B. Tauris, ISBN 978-1-86064-506-8
- Cheryl Buckley (1990), Potters and Paintresses: Women Designers in the Pottery Industry, 1870–1955, Women's Press, OCLC 21597740

Research articles

Cheryl Buckley (2020), 'Made in Patriarchy II: Researching (or Re-searching) Women and Design', Design Issues, volume 36, number 1, Winter 2020, 19-29.https://doi.org/10.1162/desi_a_00572

- Cheryl Buckley (1998), "On the Margins: Theorizing the History and Significance of Making and Designing Clothes at Home", Journal of Design History, 11 (2): 157–171, doi:10.1093/jdh/11.2.157
- Cheryl Buckley (1986), "Made in Patriarchy: Toward a Feminist Analysis of Women and Design", Design Issues, 3 (2): 3–14, doi:10.2307/1511480, JSTOR 1511480, S2CID 145562599
