= Design theory =

Subfield of design research

Design theory is a subfield of design research concerned with various theoretical approaches towards understanding and delineating design principles, design knowledge, and design practice.

== History ==
Design theory has been approached and interpreted in many ways, from designers' personal statements of design principles, through constructs of the philosophy of design to a search for a design science.

The essay "Ornament and Crime" by Adolf Loos from 1908 is one of the early 'principles' design-theoretical texts. Others include Le Corbusier's Vers une architecture (1923), and Victor Papanek's Design for the real world (1972).

In a 'principles' approach to design theory, the De Stijl movement (founded in 1917) promoted a geometrical abstract, "ascetic" form of purism that was limited to functionality. This modernist attitude underpinned the Bauhaus movement (1919 onwards). Principles were drawn up for design that were applicable to all areas of modern aesthetics.

For an introduction to the philosophy of design see the article by Per Galle at the Royal Danish Academy.

An example of early design science was Altshuller's Theory of inventive problem solving, known as TRIZ, which originated in the Soviet Union in the 1940s. Herbert Simon's 1969 The sciences of the artificial developed further foundations for a science of design. Since then the further development of fields such as design methods, design research, design science, design studies and design thinking has promoted a wider understanding of design theory.

== See also ==
- Design history
- Design research
- Design science

== Sources ==
- Adolf Loos, Ornament and Crime, 1908
- Walter Gropius, The capacity of the Bauhaus idea, 1922
- Raymond Loewy, The Mayan threshold, 1951
- Roland Barthes, Mythologies, 1957, Frankfurt am Main, Suhrkamp, 2003 (in 1964) ISBN 3-518-12425-0 [Excerpt from: Mythologies, 1957]
- Tomás Maldonado, New developments in the industry, 1958
- Marshall McLuhan, The medium is the message, 1964
- Abraham Moles, The crisis of functionalism, 1968
- Herbert A. Simon, The Science of Design, 1969
- Horst Rittel, Dilemmas in a general theory of planning, 1973
- Lucius Burckhardt, design is invisible, 1980
- Annika Frye, Design und Improvisation: Produkte, Prozesse und Methoden, transcript, Bielefeld, 2017 ISBN 978-3837634938
- Maurizio Vitta, The Meaning of Design, 1985
- Andrea Branzi, We are the primitives, 1985
- Dieter Rams, Ramsifikation, 1987
- Maurizio Morgantini, Man Confronted by the Third Technological Generation, 1989
- Otl Aicher, Bauhaus and Ulm, 1991
- Gui Bonsiepe, On Some virtues of Design
- Claudia Mareis, design as a knowledge culture, 2011
- Bruce Sterling,today Tomorrow composts, 2005
- Tony Fry, Design Beyond the Limits, 2011
- Tom Bieling, Design (&) Activism – Perspectives on Design as Activism and Activism as Design. Mimesis, Milano, 2019, ISBN 978-88-6977-241-2
- Nigel Cross, design thinking, Berg, Oxford, 2011 ISBN 9781847886361
- Victor Margolin, The Politics of the Artificial: Essays on Design and Design Studies, 2002
- Yana Milev, D.A.: A Transdisciplinary Handbook of Design Anthropology, 2013
- Michael Schulze, concept and concept of the work. The sculptural design in architectural education, Zurich vdf, Hochschulverlag AG at the ETH Zurich, 2013, ISBN 978-3-7281-3481-3
- Dieter Pfister, Atmospheric style. On the importance of atmosphere and design for a socially sustainable interior design, Basel, 2013, ISBN 978-3-906129-84-6
- Tim Parsons, Thinking: Objects, Contemporary Approaches to Product Design (AVA Academia Advanced), Juli 2009, ISBN 978-2940373741
