= Philosophy of design =

Study of the definitions, assumptions, and implications of design

Philosophy of design is the study of definitions of design, and the assumptions, foundations, and implications of design. The field, which is mostly a sub-discipline of aesthetics, is defined by an interest in a set of problems, or an interest in central or foundational concerns in design. In addition to these central problems for design as a whole, many philosophers of design consider these problems as they apply to particular disciplines (e.g. philosophy of art).

Although most practitioners are philosophers specialized in aesthetics (i.e., aestheticians), several prominent designers and artists have contributed to the field. For an introduction to the philosophy of design see the article by Per Galle at the Royal Danish Academy of Art.

== Notable philosophers and theorists ==
Philosophers of design, or philosophers relevant to the philosophical study of design:

- L. Bruce Archer
- Roland Barthes
- Anne Balsamo
- Jean Baudrillard
- Albert Borgmann
- Richard Buchanan
- Clive Dilnot
- Johanna Drucker
- Umberto Eco
- Cameron Tonkinwise
- Vilem Flusser
- Jane Forsey
- Tony Fry
- Bruno Latour
- Marshall McLuhan
- Per Mollerup
- Victor Papanek
- Glenn Parsons
- Martin Heidegger
- Bernard Stiegler
- Peter-Paul Verbeek
