= Design research (disambiguation) =

Design research is the study of design and design methods.

Design research may also refer to:

- The Design Research Society, an international society for design research
- Design Research Unit, a British consultancy formed in 1943
- Design Research (store) (D/R), a retail lifestyle store in Cambridge, Massachusetts, and later a chain, Design Research International, 1953-1979
- The Design Research building, 1969, by Ben Thompson, built for the Design Research store in Cambridge, Massachusetts
