= Susan Sensemann =

American painter

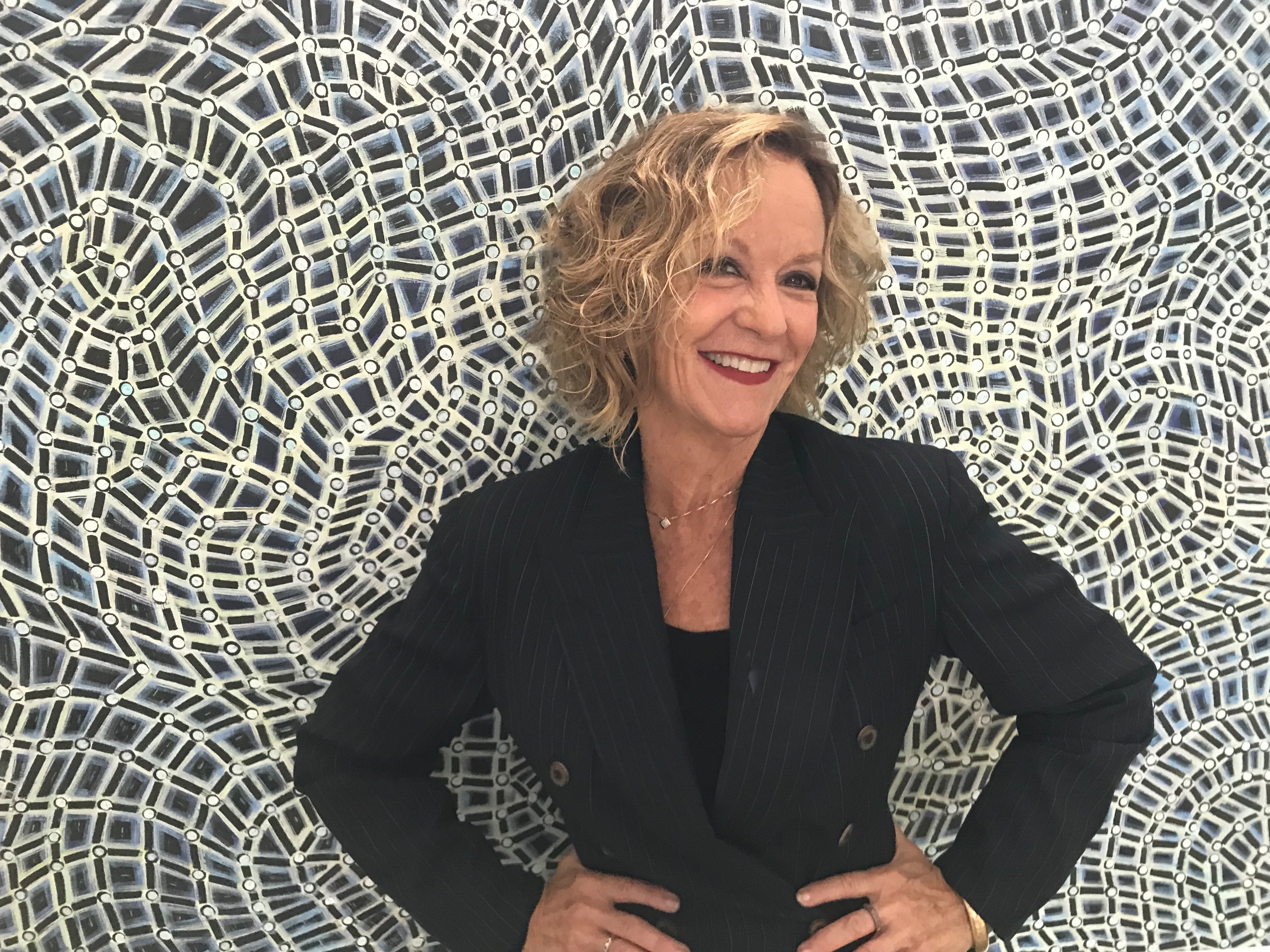
- Artist Susan Sensemann, in 2018, in front of her painting, The Sum of Something (2017).
- Born: 1949 (age 76–77); Glen Cove, New York, US
- Education: Tyler School of Art, Syracuse University
- Known for: Painting, Drawing, Photography
- Style: Abstract, Collage, Postmodern, Feminist
- Website: Susan Sensemann

Susan Sensemann (born 1949) is an American artist, educator and arts administrator, best known for her detailed, largely abstract patterned paintings and photomontages reflecting gothic, baroque, spiritual and feminist sensibilities. She has exhibited her work at venues including the Art Institute of Chicago, A.I.R., The Living Art Museum (Reykjavík), Indianapolis Art Center, Chicago Cultural Center, and Art Institute of Boston, on four continents. Her work has been widely reviewed and resides in numerous private, university and corporate collections. Sensemann is known as a versatile and prolific creator, whose ideas have led her to explore diverse painting materials, media (drawing, photography, collage, performance), subject matter (architectural, botanical, biological and organic forms, self-portraiture), and styles from abstraction to realism. Critics note her work's densely packed compositions, shallow fields of oscillating space, complex tactile surfaces, and sensuous color and linearity. James Yood wrote that Sensemann's abstract paintings were "fraught with meaning, charged with value, and seething with import" in their spiritual seeking. Art historian Leisa Rundquist described her photomontage self-portraits as "strangely sensual, yet disturbing" images drawn from "the depths of the unconscious."

In addition to her art career, Sensemann was an art professor and administrator for over three decades, most notably at the University of Illinois at Chicago and the grassroots women's cooperative Artemisia Gallery. She has also been a frequent curator and lecturer, and in recent years, begun writing fiction and teaching courses in mindfulness meditation. Sensemann lives and works in Easthampton, Massachusetts.

== Life and career ==
Sensemann was born in Glen Cove, New York in 1949. Her early interest in art was sparked by trips with her mother to New York City art museums and a supportive art teacher who introduced her to Cubism in sixth grade. She studied printmaking at Syracuse University (BFA, 1971), but gravitated to painting after spending junior year at the Tyler School of Art, Rome. She enrolled in the graduate program at Tyler at Temple University (MFA, painting, 1973), studying with painter Richard Callner, whose mythological paintings and glazing techniques influenced her early work.

In 1973, Sensemann took a teaching position at the University of Illinois Urbana-Champaign. While there, she met her future husband, sculptor Barry Hehemann. They married in 1979 and moved into a live/work loft in Chicago's industrial Bucktown neighborhood (they divorced in 2004). In 1981, Sensemann joined the faculty at the School of Art and Design, University of Illinois at Chicago (UIC), where she would remain until 2010. After she and Hehemann had two children, Lucas (b. 1981) and Marah (b. 1985). Sensemann continued to show internationally and throughout the United States, including solo exhibitions at the Roy Boyd, Artemisia (both Chicago), Fay Gold (Atlanta) and Locus (St. Louis) galleries and the Evanston Art Center, among many. She also served as co-president and board member of Artemisia Gallery (1994–2001), where she co-created international artist exchange and mentoring programs, curated shows, and exhibited and lectured internationally on women's issues in art.

== Work and reception ==
Susan Sensemann, Eguchi, oil on canvas, 64" x 64", 1983.

Sensemann describes her approach to art as "expansive, holistic, multi-focused, and non-hierarchical," and cites the influence of feminist artists such as Hannah Höch, Eva Hesse and Harmony Hammond, as well as Italian Renaissance painters like Caravaggio, Artemisia Gentileschi and Bellini. These influences manifest in her work's emphasis on visual and tactile sensuality and themes of indeterminacy, transformation, and what she calls "restless becoming."

=== Architectural Abstraction ===
In the 1970s, Sensemann focused on small egg-tempera and oil paintings of feminist archetypes such as Salome and Magdalene and "fantastic landscapes" of dense, brightly colored botanical imagery that flirted with both realism and abstraction. Her move to Chicago in 1979 inspired a shift to abstract, architectonic work that nonetheless suggested actual spaces. Often titled after mythological goddesses, the new paintings explored the spirit and psychological implications of austere interiors that symbolized the domain of women. Sensemann enlivened the spaces with ghost-like whorls or spirals that hinted at kinetic energy, "spiritual emanations" or traces from unseen or absent actors and encounters. She initially based the works on architectural forms she photographed on trips to Italy ("Tusculana" series) or Japanese art and kabuki forms, before turning to structures from pre-Renaissance paintings by Duccio, Fra Angelico, Giotto and Piero della Francesca in the "Annunciation" works (1983–4).

Painted in reds, cranberries, tangerines and aquas, works such as Eguchi (1983) employed geometric organizations of architectural planes, light and shadow that created ambiguous space, yet anchored complex, scoured impasto surfaces described as "painstakingly textured, almost sculptural relief." Critic James Yood suggested Sensemann's "churning brushwork, intense colors, stippled surfaces, and abstract symbology" signified a pursuit of higher knowledge through the methods of modern art. Sensemann moved toward sparer geometric forms in later series such as "Shekina" (1989–90), whose title derives from a Hebrew word associated with feminine divine attributes. Alan Artner described them as the culmination of a "process of reduction that long has signaled an artistic quest for spiritual purity."

Susan Sensemann, State, oil on canvas, three panels, each 60” x 24", 1990.

=== "Gulf War" works ===
The looming U.S. Gulf War focused Sensemann in a more discordant, political direction in her "State" series (1990), which used geometric shapes to reference gun sights and targets, and thick paint application to create flux through shifts of light and vantage point. In the "Gulf War" series (1991), she translated masterworks of conflict and violence by Caravaggio, Delacroix, Gericault and Rembrandt into charged, jostling compositions of unrestrained abstract color, light and texture. Within these darker, chaotic works she placed unexpected "intrusions," such as the word "raft" or outlined votive candles, signaling the possibility of hope or resolution. Critic Kristin Schleifer described these expressionist paintings as a logical progression in Sensemann's work that evoked the forces of nature with a greater vitality than ever before.

Susan Sensemann, Objectivity as Means of Terminating Panics, cut paper and glue, 18” x 14", 1995.

=== Collage work ===
Susan Sensemann, "Burst: incapable of control, her temper was inspired as a marvelous wildness", lambda print, 39” x 26", 2003.

In 1993, Sensemann made an overt break with the strife of the "Gulf War" works and abstraction. She began creating decorative, collaged oil paintings on upholstery fabric that recalled the overflowing compositions and patterns of her fantastic landscapes. The paintings also indicated a shift to the more direct critical language of feminist collage. In a subsequent series of 600 collages, she embraced strategies of juxtaposition, fragmentation and rupture, reflecting the alternative influence of Hannah Höch, Meret Oppenheim, Martha Rosler and writer Susan Griffin. In works such as Objectivity as Means of Terminating Panics (1995), Sensemann made startling use of cut-up "Americana" images from 19th-century bibles, mid-20th-century childbirth, health and parenting manuals, encyclopedias, art reproductions and National Geographic images. Probing them with a politically incorrect sensibility, she compiled taxonomies of highly gendered images that offered fresh readings and satiric, sometimes disturbing commentary on roleplay, stereotypes, misinformation and "masculine" art.

=== Photomontages ===
Sensemann reworked these strategies in new works that combined Gothic sensibilities, feminist self-portraiture, and themes of voyeurism, vulnerability and exhibitionism influenced by the work of Sophie Calle and Ana Mendieta. Carefully superimposing photographs she took of organic substances over intimate close-ups of her face, she merged with flora, seaweed or cacti in "De-Monstrations" works such as Hide (1998), producing grotesque and seductive alterations to her flesh that suggested decay, ravage or regeneration, endured with a facial expression of impassivity. These works, created through non-digital means and ultimately numbering more than 700, recalled cultural constructions of symbiosis between women and nature and were interpreted as meditations on the transience and the ephemerality of life, the passage of time and its effects, and notions of beauty, eroticism and glamour. In the "Impersonations" works, whose titles reference masquerade and the role of surface in mapping identity, she explored her "unbridled urge to merge with unfamiliar and unknown," fusing with marble busts, statuary, Roman murals and decorative objects to take on a range of characters: Buddha, temptress, princess, king, gnome, monster.

Critics described the photomontages as rich, sensuous, disturbing and primal in their ability to conjure deep psychic responses. Their unexpected transformations evoked the dichotomies of attraction/desire and repulsion/fear found in Gothic works like Mary Shelley's Frankenstein, which explore the violation of boundaries and natural laws. Theorist Victor Margolin called them "acts of disclosure rather than concealment," revealing a negotiation between inner fluidity and bodily limitation. The images often probed transgressive realms of the imagination at the edge of identity, as in Slice (2001), which effects an alternating, reciprocal exchange of feminine and masculine between Sensemann and a fierce Bacchus countenance on an Italian serving plate.

=== "Dots" and "Nets" series ===
Sensemann returned to more abstract art in the 2000s, with several bodies of large-scale, baroque works in which accumulations of small marks, dots, dashes or blips collide and overlap to create dizzying fields of complex patterns. Suggesting micro- or macroscopic investigations of disparate biological and social structures—cells, tears, stars, populations—the holistic surfaces maintain a fluctuating balance of definition and diffusion, qualities glimpsed in Sensemann's earlier "Sheer" and "Lace" series (1995–8) and fantastic landscapes, which also featured shallow spaces and concentrated patterning.

Susan Sensemann, Solitary Pleasures, acrylic ink on wood panel, 24” x 48", 2016.

In her "Goo" series (2003), she created works influenced by William Morris textiles, with expressionist calligraphic patterns or spontaneous flows of color suggesting primordial ooze. The "Night Sky" series (2005–7) featured more neutral, monochrome palettes and forms referencing constellations, sea life and human biology. An offshoot of that work was a show of large—up to 35 feet—realistic, but patterned drawings of natural and organic forms that some considered among Sensemann's most brave and intriguing work. The "Dots" series (2007–11), which includes paintings such as Solitary Pleasures (2016), extended her explorations of pattern to more colorful, oscillating forms reminiscent of flora, cells, or hives. With the "Indra's Net" (2016–8) works, she focused on skewed grid patterns of intricate net and lace-like arrangements, that ranged from organic to almost geometric and expressed a Buddhist visualization of interconnectedness and a feminist critique of 1960s, hard-edged abstraction.

== Career as educator ==
Sensemann began teaching in 1973 at the school of art and design at the University of Illinois Urbana-Champaign. She earned tenure at age 30, leaving as an associate professor in 1981 for the school of art and design, University of Illinois at Chicago. As professor at UIC, she taught studio classes, created a course on writing for artists, and led a class in Rome. Some of her students include conceptual artist Tom Friedman, writer Mira Bartok, mixed-media artist Arturo Herrera, and sculptor Jorge Pardo. Sensemann served in several capacities at the school, including appointments as director of graduate studies (1986–90), acting director (1989–91), and director of undergraduate studies (2000–05). In 2010, she retired as professor emerita.

Sensemann's educational experience also includes teaching international workshops at the Royal Conservatory of Brussels and lecturing on painting, feminist work, contemporary women in the arts, and her own work at institutions in China, Italy, Germany, South Korea and the U.S. She has been selected as a visiting artist at more than twenty schools including the Cranbrook Academy of Art, Jilin Normal University (China), Texas Woman's University and School of the Art Institute of Chicago.

== Curating and writing ==
Sensemann has been an active curator, at venues including the Evanston Art Center, Gallery 400, and Artemisia Gallery. Described as "curatorially adventurous," her shows have explored signature themes such as pleasure, eroticism and excess ("Libidinal," "Heat," "Obsession," "Touch," "More is More"), the body ("Physiotasmagorical," "Brain/Body"), and feminism. The shows "Skew: The Unruly Grid" (1995) and "Pleasure (Beyond Guilt)" (1996) investigated and critiqued masculinist traditions of the grid in art and the production of art for the (traditionally male) voyeuristic gaze, respectively.

Sensemann has written catalogue essays to accompany her curated exhibitions, as well as pieces on artists such as Hannah Höch, Miyoko Ito (an influence on Sensemann's abstract work of the 1980s), and Claire Wolf Krantz, for publications such as Design Issues and Art Papers. She has also written poetry and fiction, and given performances of her work at galleries and clubs. Her "Consorting with Nathaniel Hawthorne" series (2002–4) paired photomontages of her face and silk funerary arrangements, such as Burst... (2003), with poems on love and loss that she wrote through a self-devised game plucking words from Hawthorne's short stories. In recent years, she has turned to fiction writing, including two short stories, "Encountering History" (2016) and "Blasting" (2018), both published in Chicago Quarterly Review.

== Collections and recognition ==
Sensemann's works are held in private, university and corporate collections, including the Illinois State Museum, Purdue University, Northeast Normal University (China), University of Delaware, Southern Illinois University, Millikin University, Ripon College and Lakeview Museum of Arts and Sciences, among many. She has been awarded grants from MUCIA, British Arts Council, Illinois Arts Council and Chicago Artists International for projects in South Korea, Belfast, Northern Ireland, and Prague and Finland, respectively.
