= Design =

Plan for the construction of an object or system

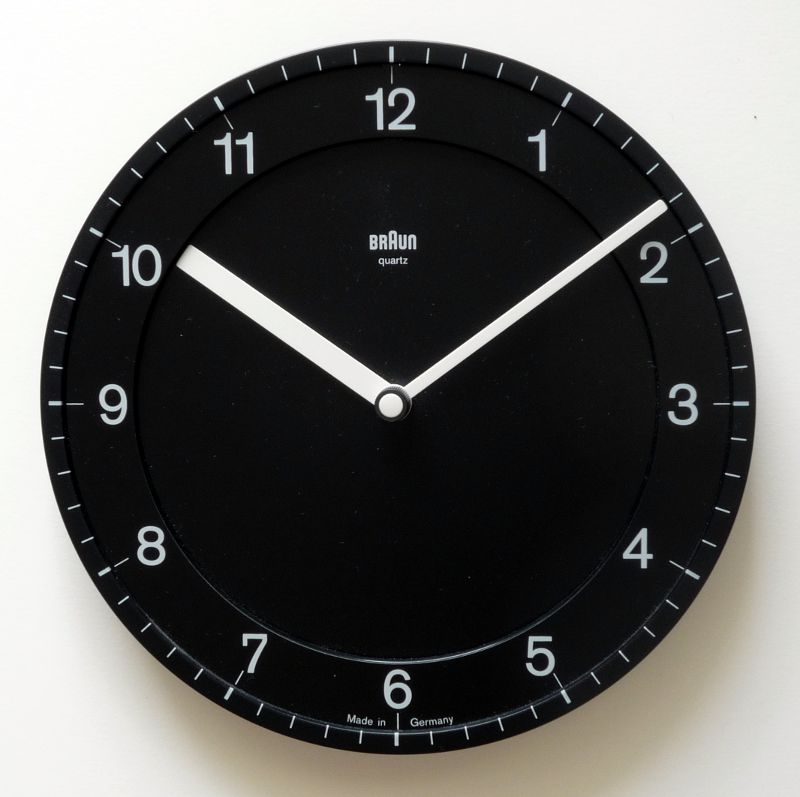
Braun ABW30 wall clock designed by Dieter Rams and Dietrich Lubs (early 1980s)

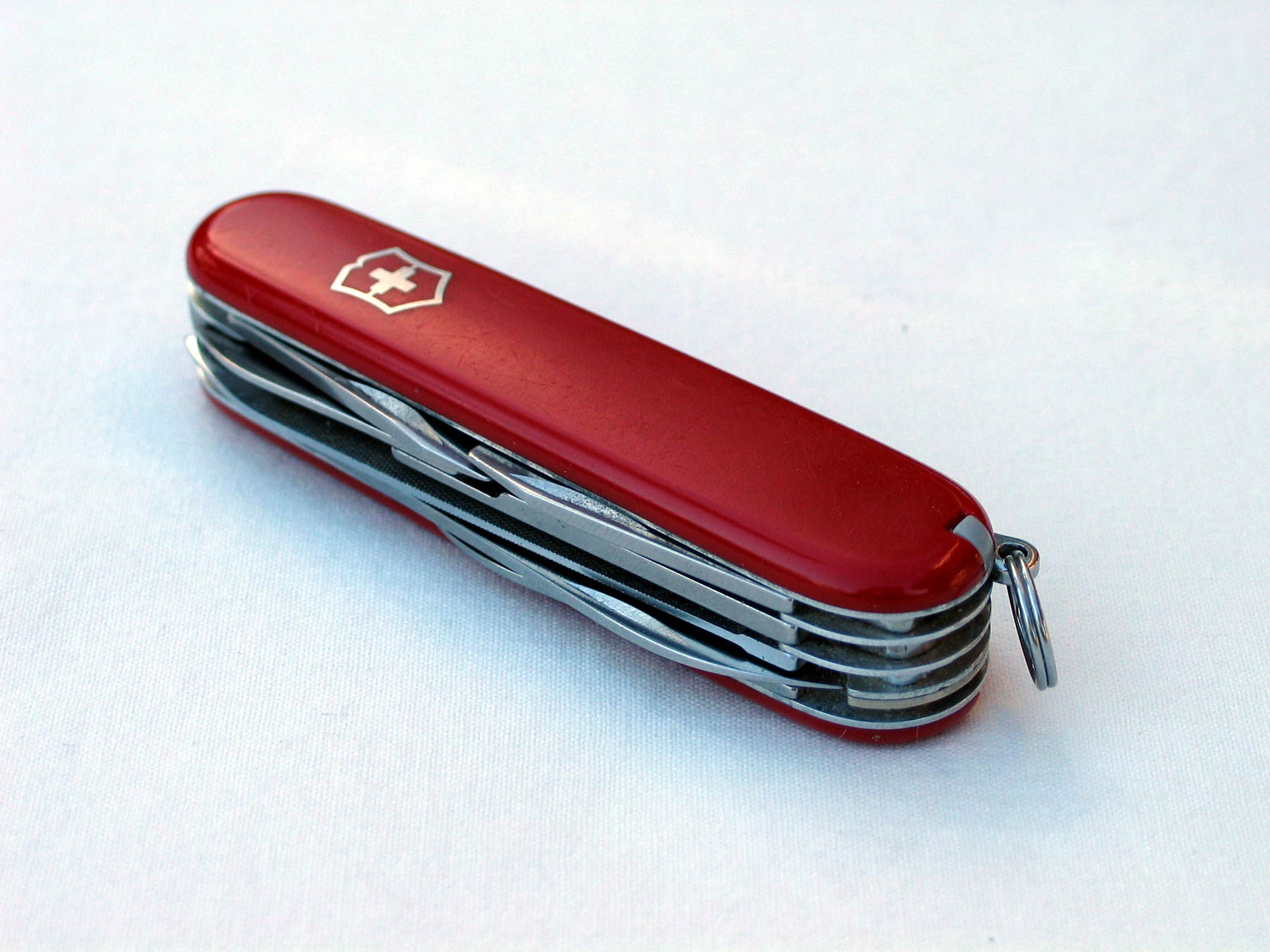
Victorinox Swiss Army knife

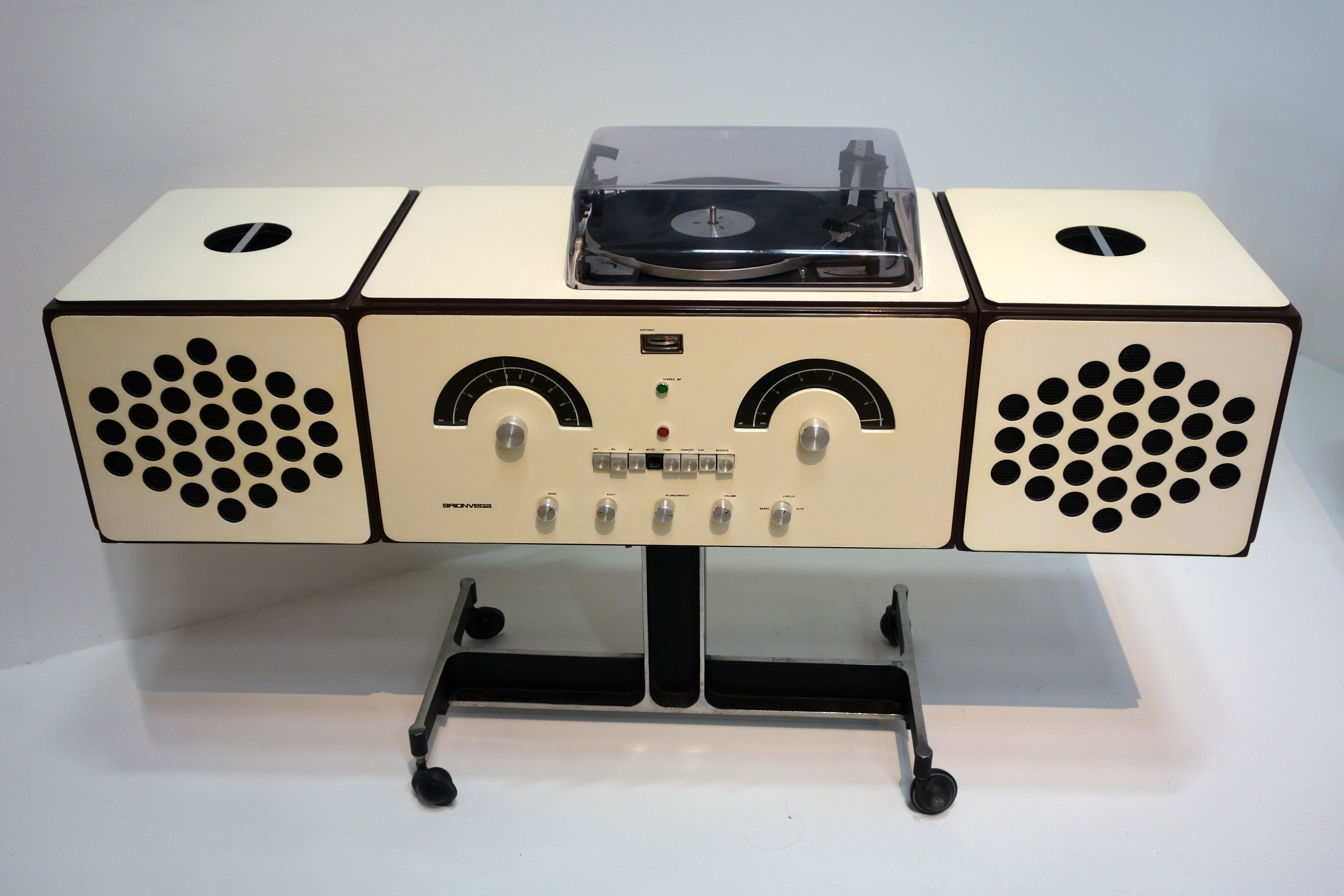
Brionvega RR 126 radiogram designed by Achille and Pier Giacomo Castiglioni

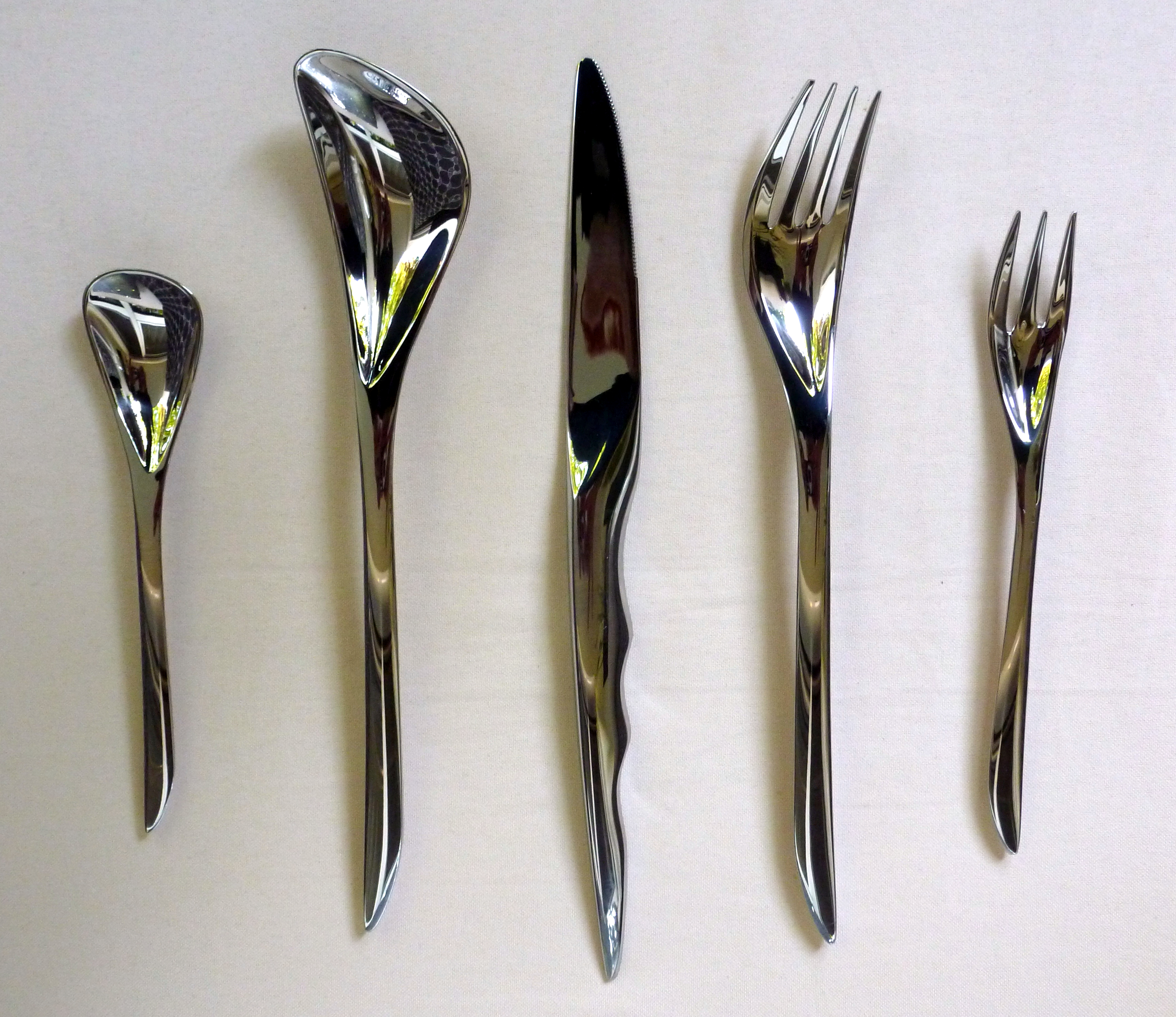
Cutlery designed by architect and designer Zaha Hadid (2007). The slightly oblique end part of the fork and the spoons, as well as the knife handle, are examples of designing for both aesthetic form and practical function.

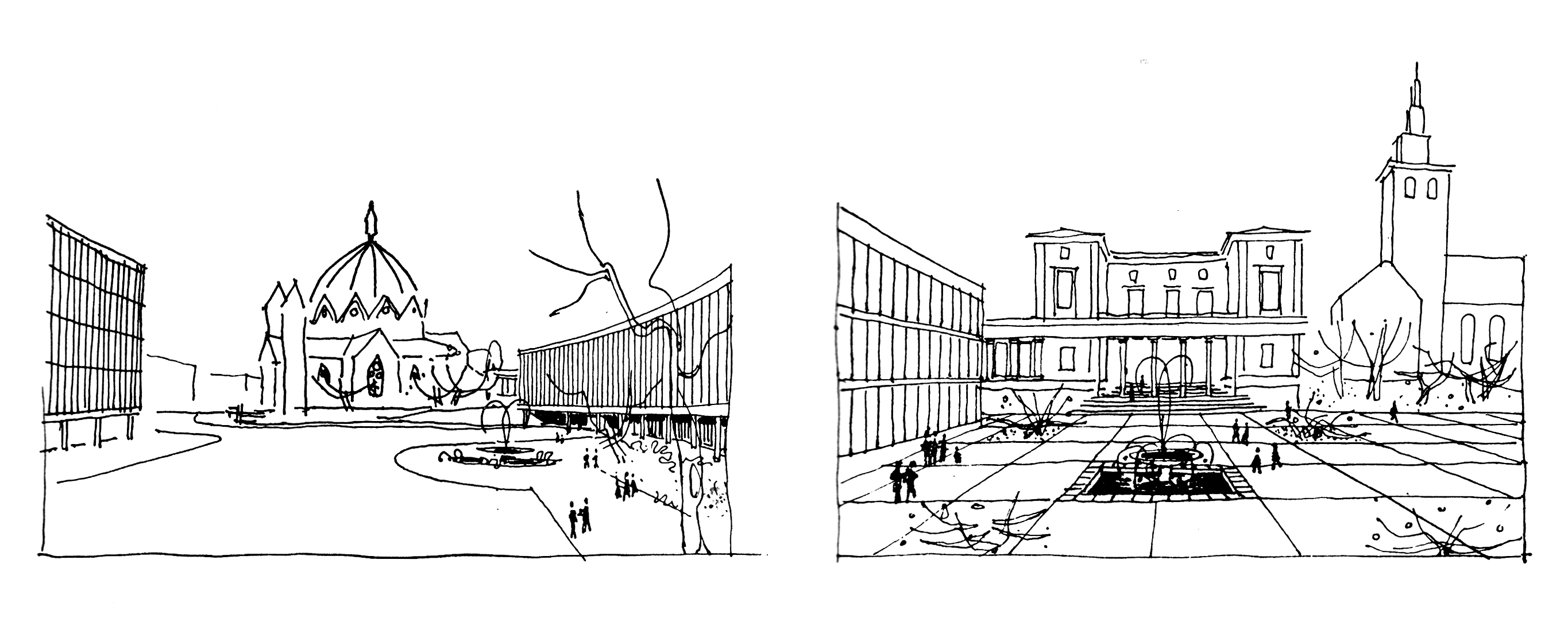
Early concept design sketches by the architect Erling Viksjø, exploring the relationships between existing and proposed new buildings

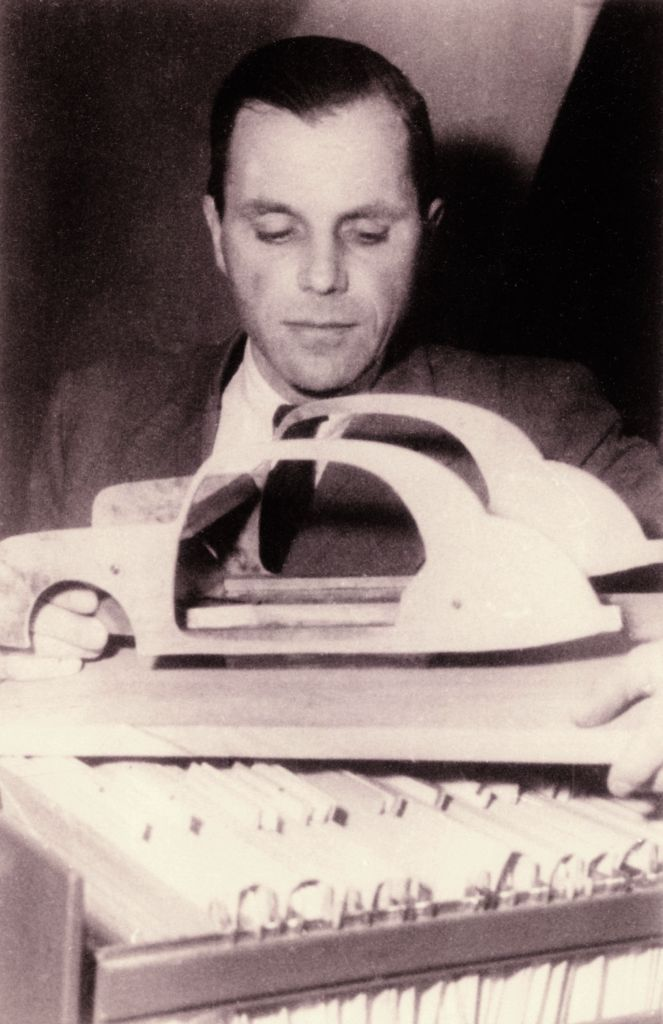
Barényi Béla, considered to be the father of safe driving and safety tests, preparing for safety development, which is a core part of the designing process

A design is the concept or proposal for an object, process, or system. The word design refers to something that is or has been intentionally created by a thinking agent, and is sometimes used to refer to the inherent nature of something – its design. The verb to design expresses the process of developing a design. In some cases, the direct construction of an object without an explicit prior plan may also be considered to be a design, such as in arts and crafts. A design is expected to have a purpose within a specific context, typically aiming to satisfy certain goals and constraints while taking into account aesthetic, functional and experiential considerations. Traditional examples of designs are architectural and engineering drawings, circuit diagrams, sewing patterns, and less tangible artefacts such as business process models.

== Designing ==
People who produce designs are called designers. The term 'designer' usually refers to someone who works professionally in a design field. Within the professions, the word 'designer' is generally qualified by the area of practice (for example: a fashion designer, a product designer, a web designer, or an interior designer), but it can also designate other practitioners such as architects and engineers (see below: Types of designing). A designer's sequence of activities to produce a design is called a design process, with some employing designated processes such as design thinking and design methods. The process of creating a design can be brief (a quick sketch) or lengthy and complicated, involving considerable research, negotiation, reflection, modeling, interactive adjustment, and re-design.

Designing is also a widespread activity outside the professions of those formally recognized as designers. In his influential book The Sciences of the Artificial, the interdisciplinary scientist Herbert A. Simon proposed that, "Everyone designs who devises courses of action aimed at changing existing situations into preferred ones." According to the design researcher Nigel Cross, "Everyone can – and does – design," and "Design ability is something that everyone has, to some extent, because it is embedded in our brains as a natural cognitive function."

== History of design ==
The study of design history is complicated by varying interpretations of what constitutes 'designing'. Many design historians, such as John Heskett, look to the Industrial Revolution and the development of mass production. Others subscribe to conceptions of design that include pre-industrial objects and artefacts, beginning their narratives of design in prehistoric times. Originally situated within art history, the historical development of the discipline of design history coalesced in the 1970s, as interested academics worked to recognize design as a separate and legitimate target for historical research. Early influential design historians include German-British art historian Nikolaus Pevsner and Swiss historian and architecture critic Sigfried Giedion.

== Design education ==
In Western Europe, institutions for design education date back to the nineteenth century. The Norwegian National Academy of Craft and Art Industry was founded in 1818, followed by the United Kingdom's Government School of Design (1837), and Konstfack in Sweden (1844). The Rhode Island School of Design was founded in the United States in 1877. The German art and design school Bauhaus, founded in 1919, greatly influenced modern design education.

Design education covers the teaching of theory, knowledge, and values in the design of products, services, and environments, with a focus on the development of both particular and general skills for designing. Traditionally, its primary orientation has been to prepare students for professional design practice, based on project work and studio, or atelier, teaching methods.

There are also broader forms of higher education in design studies and design thinking. Design is also a part of general education, for example within the curriculum topic, Design and Technology. The development of design in general education in the 1970s created a need to identify fundamental aspects of 'designerly' ways of knowing, thinking, and acting, which resulted in establishing design as a distinct discipline of study.

== Design process ==
Substantial disagreement exists concerning how designers in many fields, whether amateur or professional, alone or in teams, produce designs. Design researchers Kees Dorst and Judith Dijkhuis acknowledged that "there are many ways of describing design processes," and compare and contrast two dominant but different views of the design process: as a rational problem-solving process and as a process of reflection-in-action. They suggested that these two paradigms "represent two fundamentally different ways of looking at the world – positivism and constructionism." The paradigms may reflect differing views of how designing should be done and how it actually is done, and both have a variety of names. The problem-solving view has been called "the rational model," "technical rationality" and "the reason-centric perspective." The alternative view has been called "reflection-in-action," "coevolution" and "the action-centric perspective."

=== Rational model ===
The rational model was independently developed by Herbert A. Simon, an American scientist, and two German engineering design theorists, Gerhard Pahl and Wolfgang Beitz. It posits that:

1. Designers attempt to optimize a design candidate for known constraints and objectives.
2. The design process is plan-driven.
3. The design process is understood in terms of a discrete sequence of stages.

The rational model is based on a rationalist philosophy and underlies the waterfall model, systems development life cycle, and much of the engineering design literature. According to the rationalist philosophy, design is informed by research and knowledge in a predictable and controlled manner.

Typical stages consistent with the rational model include the following:

- Pre-production design
  - Design brief – initial statement of intended outcome.
  - Analysis – analysis of design goals.
  - Research – investigating similar designs in the field or related topics.
  - Specification – specifying requirements of a design for a product (product design specification) or service.
  - Problem solving – conceptualizing and documenting designs.
  - Presentation – presenting designs.
- Design during production.
  - Development – continuation and improvement of a design.
  - Product testing – in situ testing of a design.
- Post-production design feedback for future designs.
  - Implementation – introducing the design into the environment.
  - Evaluation and conclusion – summary of process and results, including constructive criticism and suggestions for future improvements.
- Redesign – any or all stages in the design process repeated (with corrections made) at any time before, during, or after production.

Each stage has many associated best practices.

==== Criticism of the rational model ====
The rational model has been widely criticized on two primary grounds:

1. Designers do not work this way – extensive empirical evidence has demonstrated that designers do not act as the rational model suggests.
2. Unrealistic assumptions – goals are often unknown when a design project begins, and the requirements and constraints continue to change.

=== Action-centric model ===
The action-centric perspective is a label given to a collection of interrelated concepts, which are antithetical to the rational model. It posits that:

1. Designers use creativity and emotion to generate design candidates.
2. The design process is improvised.
3. No universal sequence of stages is apparent – analysis, design, and implementation are contemporary and inextricably linked.

The action-centric perspective is based on an empiricist philosophy and broadly consistent with the agile approach and methodical development. Substantial empirical evidence supports the veracity of this perspective in describing the actions of real designers. Like the rational model, the action-centric model sees design as informed by research and knowledge.

At least two views of design activity are consistent with the action-centric perspective. Both involve the following three basic activities:

- In the reflection-in-action paradigm, designers alternate between "framing", "making moves", and "evaluating moves". "Framing" refers to conceptualizing the problem, i.e., defining goals and objectives. A "move" is a tentative design decision. The evaluation process may lead to further moves in the design.
- In the sensemaking–coevolution–implementation framework, designers alternate between its three titular activities. Sensemaking includes both framing and evaluating moves. Implementation is the process of constructing the design object. Coevolution is "the process where the design agent simultaneously refines its mental picture of the design object based on its mental picture of the context, and vice versa".

The concept of the design cycle is understood as a circular time structure, which may start with the thinking of an idea, then expressing it by the use of visual or verbal means of communication (design tools), the sharing and perceiving of the expressed idea, and finally starting a new cycle with the critical rethinking of the perceived idea. Anderson points out that this concept emphasizes the importance of the means of expression, which at the same time are means of perception of any design ideas.

== Philosophies ==
Philosophy of design is the study of definitions, assumptions, foundations, and implications of design. There are also many informal 'philosophies' for guiding design such as personal values, personal aesthetics or preferred approaches.

=== Approaches to design ===
Some of these values and approaches include:

- Conscious design is an intentional, systems-aware approach that prioritizes the long-term impact of objects and environments on both human well-being and ecological health. It goes beyond just aesthetics by integrating circular economy principles, ethical material sourcing, and psychological health into the core of the design process.
- Critical design uses designed artefacts as an embodied critique or commentary on existing values, morals, and practices in a culture. Critical design can make aspects of the future physically present to provoke a reaction.
- Ecological design is a design approach that prioritizes the consideration of the environmental impacts of a product or service, over its whole lifecycle. Ecodesign research focuses primarily on barriers to implementation, ecodesign tools and methods, and the intersection of ecodesign with other research disciplines.
- Participatory design (originally co-operative design, now often co-design) is the practice of collective creativity to design, attempting to actively involve all stakeholders (e.g. employees, partners, customers, citizens, end-users) in the design process to help ensure the result meets their needs and is usable. Recent research suggests that designers create more innovative concepts and ideas when working within a co-design environment with others than they do when creating ideas on their own.
- Scientific design refers to industrialised design based on scientific knowledge. Science can be used to study the effects and need for a potential or existing product in general and to design products that are based on scientific knowledge. For instance, a scientific design of face masks for COVID-19 mitigation may be based on investigations of filtration performance, mitigation performance, thermal comfort, biodegradability and flow resistance.
- Service design is a term that is used for designing or organizing the experience around a product and the service associated with a product's use. The purpose of service design methodologies is to establish the most effective practices for designing services, according to both the needs of users and the competencies and capabilities of service providers.
- Sociotechnical system design, a philosophy and tools for participative designing of work arrangements and supporting processes – for organizational purpose, quality, safety, economics, and customer requirements in core work processes, the quality of peoples experience at work, and the needs of society.
- Transgenerational design, the practice of making products and environments compatible with those physical and sensory impairments associated with human aging and which limit major activities of daily living.
- User-centered design, which focuses on the needs, wants, and limitations of the end-user of the designed artefact. One aspect of user-centered design is ergonomics.

== Types of designing ==
- Applied arts
- Architecture
- Automotive design
- Biological design
- Cartographic or map design
- Configuration design
- Communication design
- Costume design
- Design management
- Engineering design
- Experience design
- Exterior design
- Fashion design
- Floral design
- Furniture design
- Game design
- Graphic design
- Information architecture
- Information design
- Industrial design
- Instructional design
- Interaction design
- Interior design
- Landscape architecture
- Lighting design
- Modular design
- Motion graphic design
- Organization design
- Process design
- Product design
- Production design
- Property design
- Scenic design
- Service design
- Social design
- Software design
- Sound design
- Spatial design
- Strategic design
- Systems architecture
- Systems design
- Systems modeling
- Type design
- Urban design
- User experience design
- User interface design
- Vexillography
- Web design

== See also ==
- Design competition
- Design methods
- Design museums
- Design prototyping
- Design research
- Design science
- Design theory
- Design thinking
- Design-based learning
- Evidence-based design
- Global Design Database
- List of design awards
- List of furniture designers
- List of industrial designers
- Outline of design
- Universal design
- Visual design elements and principles
