= Kees van Overveld =

Dutch physicist (1957–2014)

C.W.A.M. (Kees) van Overveld (8 November 1957, Roosendaal – 16 December 2014, Eindhoven) was a Dutch physicist and lecturer in design methodology. He worked at the Eindhoven University of Technology.

Kees van Overveld studied physics at the Eindhoven University of Technology until 1981. Four years later he earned a PhD in technical sciences in 1985 for his thesis “On an inversion procedure for nuclear transition densities”. During this period, from 1981 to 1985, he was a research assistant at FOM-service of the experimental nuclear physics group of T.H. Eindhoven. Later he worked as an associate professor in the Department of Computer Science of the TUe on computer graphics and simulation. Since the nineties, he was a researcher in the field of 3D television and later consultant at Philips Research. He worked also as a teacher in the design methodology at the Stan Ackermans Institute TUe. Kees van Overveld is an author of numerous patents, amongst others:

- "Method and apparatus for computing a computer graphics image of a textured surface" US 6614446 B1
- "Method and device for visualizing on a two-dimensional screen a hierarchical information structure based on nodes interconnected by edges, through fisheyed representation of nodes" US 6057843 A
- "Computer graphics system and method of rendering polygons" US 20030016232 A1
- "Embedding and detecting a watermark in an information signal" US 20010032315 A1
- "Computer graphics animation method and device" US 6515668 B1
- "Method and system for providing a user profile" US 7010547 B2

Big interest of Kees van Overveld in images brought him also to artistic cooperations. He was also active in theatre.

== Bibliography ==
Kees van Overveld has written several books and articles, i.a.:

- "On an inversion procedure for nuclear transition densities" (PhD thesis), Eindhoven: Eindhoven University of Technology, 1985.
- "An integer algorithm for rendering curved surfaces", Eindhoven: Eindhoven University of Technology, 1987.
- "Stars or stripes: a comparative study of finite and transfinite techniques for surface modeling", together with M. Verhoeven, Eindhoven: Eindhoven University of Technology, 1994.
- "Waarom? Daarom! Inzicht in gedachte-experimenten uitgaande van bekende causale verbanden" ("Why? Because! Understanding thoughts experiments from known causal relationships") General Dutch Journal of Philosophy 92(3), 2000.
- "Big images" lecture notes, Eindhoven: Eindhoven University of Technology, 2007.
- "From light to sight: an interdisciplinary approach to visual communication", Bussum: Coutinho, 2011. ISBN 978-90-469-0236-3.
