= Richard Buchanan =

Richard Buchanan may refer to:

- Richard Buchanan (politician) (1912–2003), British Labour politician
- Richard Buchanan (American football) (born 1969), former American football player
- Richard Buchanan (academic), late 20th century American professor of design
