= Victor Margolin =

American historian (1941–2019)

- Born: 1941; New York City, New York, US
- Died: November 27, 2019 (aged 77–78); Washington D.C., US

Academic background
- Education: Columbia University, Union Graduate School

Academic work
- Institutions: University of Illinois, Chicago (1982–2006)

Victor Margolin (1941–2019) was an American design historian, researcher and educator. He was a Professor of design history at the University of Illinois, Chicago, where he taught from 1982 until 2006. Margolin published widely and was the founding editor and co-editor of the academic design journal, Design Issues. A major work was his comprehensive World History of Design.

== Early life and career ==
Victor Margolin was born in 1941 in New York City and at a young age the family moved to Washington, D.C., where he grew up. He studied English literature and film at Columbia University, where he graduated in 1963. While a student, he contributed to Mad magazine and edited the university humor magazine, the Columbia Jester. After graduation, he studied film directing on a Fulbright Fellowship at the Institute of Higher Cinema Studies in Paris. Following his return to the United States, he worked briefly for the National Broadcasting Company in Washington D.C. and for the public television station, WETA. He moved to New York City in 1972, where he published his first two books on design history and design theory, American Poster Renaissance: The Great Age of Poster Design, 1890–1900 (1975) and the edited volume, Propaganda: The Art of Persuasion, WWII (1976).

In 1975, he moved to Chicago where he held several jobs in college and university administration before obtaining a PhD in design history from the Union Graduate School, a non-traditional institution based in Cincinnati. His dissertation was on the graphic design of Alexander Rodchenko, El Lissitzky, and László Moholy-Nagy.

Margolin began teaching art and design history in 1982 at the School of Art and Art History, University of Illinois, Chicago, where he was the first design historian they had hired, and taught there until retiring in 2006.

== Career ==
At the University of Illinois Margolin helped to found the academic design journal, Design Issues, which began publication in 1984. He became the founding editor and later a member of the editorial board. He edited or co-edited a series of anthologies of articles from the journal: Design Discourse (1987), The Idea of Design (1995), and The Designed World: Images, Objects, Environments (2010). He also co-edited a collection of essays originating in a conference in Chicago in 1990, Discovering Design: Explorations in Design Studies (1995). In 1997 he published The Struggle for Utopia: Rodchenko, Lissitzky, Moholy-Nagy, 1917–1946, and in 2002 a volume of his own essays, The Politics of the Artificial: Essays on Design and Design Studies. The title of this volume was a polemical play on Herbert Simon's 1969 The Sciences of the Artificial (which had a very influential role within design research and design science).

Margolin's work was interdisciplinary, crossing between fields of design history, design studies and design research, and extending into issues of sustainability and globalisation. In 1992 he initiated a debate on the interaction between design history and design research when he argued in the journal Design Studies for the incorporation of design history within design research. This led to a special issue of Design Issues in 1995, debating the role and nature of design history. He also explored and promoted socially responsible design, for example drawing on the literature of social work in an article written with his wife, Sylvia Margolin (a social worker), proposing a 'social model' of design practice, in contradistinction to the dominant 'market model'.

In the 2000s Margolin began work on a magnum opus, a comprehensive three-volume World History of Design with an international and multi-cultural perspective. The first two volumes were published in 2015, with the third volume remaining uncompleted.

Margolin had a broad view of art, and in his university office he kept a Museum of Corn-temporary Art, a collection of tourist souvenirs and suchlike popular-art ephemera. In 2002 he published a catalogue of the museum, Culture is Everywhere, in collaboration with the photographer Patty Carroll. The museum now resides in the permanent collection of the Wolfsonian in Miami Beach, Florida.

Margolin was presented with a Lifetime Achievement Award by the organizers of the LearnXDesign conference in Chicago in 2015, for his 'exemplary contributions to design history, research, education and practice' and a Lifetime Achievement Award by the Design Research Society in 2016.

Victor Margolin died on November 27, 2019, in Washington, D.C., due to complications from a spinal cord injury and dementia.

== Publications ==
=== As author ===
- Margolin, Victor (1975). American Poster Renaissance. New York City, New York: Watson-Guptill Publications. ISBN 9780823002146.
- Margolin, Victor; Brichta, Ira; Brichta, Vivian (1979). The Promise and the Product: 200 Years of American Advertising Posters. New York City, New York: Collier Macmillan.
- Margolin, Victor (1997). The Struggle for Utopia: Rodchenko, Lissitzky, Moholy-Nagy, 1917-1946 (dissertation, 1st published in 1975). Chicago, IL: University of Chicago Press. ISBN 9780226505169.
- Margolin, Victor (2002). The Politics of the Artificial: Essays on Design and Design Studies. Chicago, IL: University of Chicago Press. ISBN 0226505030.
- Margolin, Victor (2002). Culture is Everywhere: The Museum of Corn-temporary Art. Museum of Corn-temporary Art. Munich, Germany: Prestel. ISBN 9783791327600.
- Margolin, Victor (April 1, 2009). "Design in History". Design Issues. 25 (2): 94–105. doi:10.1162/desi.2009.25.2.94. eISSN 1531-4790. ISSN 0747-9360. S2CID 57562456.
- Margolin, Victor (2014). Branco, Rosa Alice (ed.). Design e Risco de Mudança [Design and the Risk of Change] (in Portuguese). Porto, Portugal: ESAD Arte + Design, Verso da História. ISBN 9789895549825.
- Margolin, Victor (2015). World History of Design. Vol. 1. London, UK: Bloomsbury Academic. ISBN 9781472566508.
- Margolin, Victor (2015). World History of Design. Vol. 2. London, UK: Bloomsbury Academic. ISBN 9781472566515.

=== As editor ===
- Rhodes, Anthony (1983). Margolin, Victor (ed.). Propaganda: The Art of Persuasion: World War II. Vol. 2. Hong Kong: Chelsea House Publishing. ISBN 9780877544630.
- Margolin, Victor, ed. (1989). Design Discourse: History, Theory, Criticism. Chicago, IL: University of Chicago Press. ISBN 9780226505145.
- Margolin, Victor; Buchanan, Richard, eds. (1995). The Idea of Design. Design issues. Cambridge, Massachusetts: MIT Press. ISBN 9780262631662.
- Buchanan, Richard; Margolin, Victor, eds. (1995). Discovering Design: Explorations in Design Studies. Chicago, IL: University of Chicago Press. ISBN 9780226078151.
- Margolin, Victor; Doordan, Dennis P.; Buchanan, Richard, eds. (2010). The Designed World: Images, Objects, Environments. Oxford, UK: Berg Publishers. ISBN 9781350096004.
