= John Heskett =

British design historian (1937–2014)

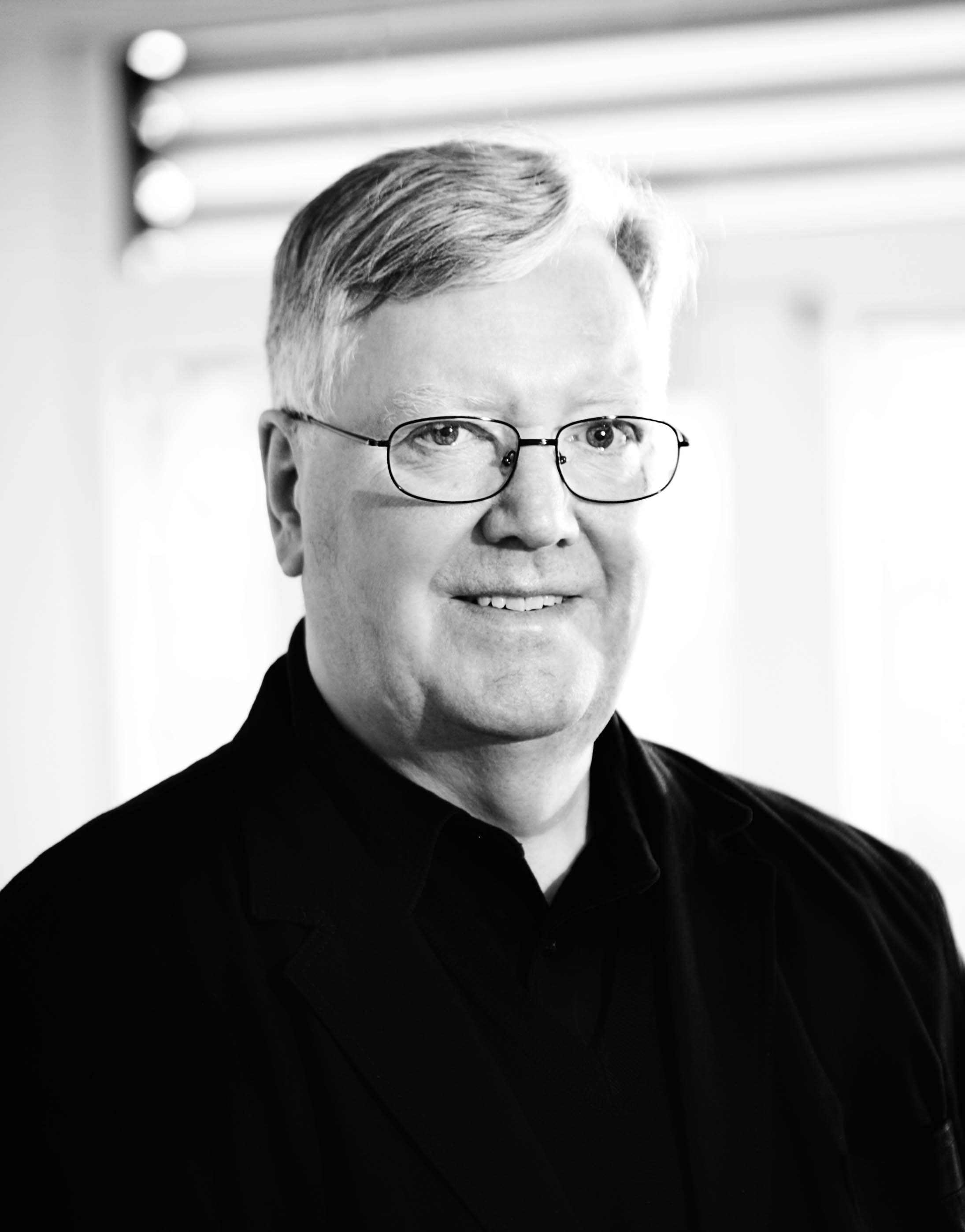
- John Heskett in 2009
- Born: 26 May 1937; Coventry, Warwickshire, England
- Died: 25 February 2014 (aged 76); Hove, East Sussex, England
- Citizenship: British
- Spouse: Pamela Heskett
- Children: 2
- Writing career
- Genres: Historian, Art historian

John Heskett (26 May 1937 – 25 February 2014) was a British writer and lecturer on the economic, political, cultural and human value of industrial design. Heskett taught primary in the fields of design history and design thinking, and was a professor at the Institute of Design, Illinois Institute of Technology (1989–2004) and the School of Design at Hong Kong Polytechnic University (2004–11), where he became the acting dean (2011–12). He was also a visiting professor at various universities in Turkey, Japan, Chile, Germany, Denmark, Sweden, and Finland.

Between the late 1970s and 2010, he published Industrial Design and Toothpicks and Logos: Design in Everyday Life, and several other books. These are considered to be significant contributions to the study of the history of design, to the study of design policy and latterly to the theoretical and applied articulation of the economic value created by design, first in the United Kingdom, then in the United States, and, in the last decade of his life, in Hong Kong.

== Early life and education ==
Born in Coventry in 1937, Heskett went to the Humphrey Perkins School in Barrow upon Soar, Leicestershire (1947–54); did national service; and gained a degree in economics, politics and history at the London School of Economics.

== Career ==
With his background, Heskett began to write history considering social, economic and political as components of design. In the early 1970s, he became part of an emerging generation of historians of design. A variety of positions followed before he obtained a design history post at Lanchester Polytechnic (1967–77). Then he taught design history and theory in Sheffield, and at Ravensbourne College, Bromley, in south-east London (1984–89). In the late 1970s, he became a prominent member of a group of academics who developed the discipline of design history and theory. His first book, Industrial Design, published in 1980, was instantly successful, since it provided one of the first accounts of industrial design as responses to changes in production methods and the organization of capitalism. His 2002 book, Toothpicks and Logos: Design in Everyday Life, became a common introductory text to design history due to its wide scope and interdisciplinary breadth.

=== In United States ===
Heskett left the United Kingdom for the United States in 1988, first to work on a project with the Design Management Institute in Boston, and, then after 1989, to teach in the graduate programmes of the Institute of Design at Illinois Institute of Technology in Chicago. By 1990, he was working for a Japanese consultancy and, throughout the next decades, he was invited to speak and advise at institutional and governmental levels in Mexico, Chile, Finland, Japan, Taiwan and South Africa.

=== In Hong Kong ===
Since 2004 in Hong Kong, Heskett undertook teaching and research concerning the roles of design in production and more widely in the economy as a whole, examining design policy at national levels in the United States, Europe and, increasingly, Asia.

Heskett was a member of the INDEX: Design to Improve Life Award Jury from 2004 and a board member of the Copenhagen Institute of Interaction Design from 2007.

== Personal life ==
Heskett was survived by his second wife, Pamela Smith, whom he married in 1992; his daughter, Ingrid, and son, Peter, both from his first marriage, to Irene Alksnis, which ended in divorce.

== Bibliography ==
Books (As single author)

- A John Heskett Reader, edited by Clive Dilnot, Bloomsbury Publishing, New York (2016) ISBN 9781474221252
- Works in China, joint author with Michael Young, privately published, Hong Kong (2011)
- Design: a very short introduction, Oxford University Press, Oxford (2005). Translated into Spanish, Swedish, Korean, Portuguese (Brazil), Japanese, Greek, Chinese, Turkish and Serbo-Croat. This book is the second edition of Toothpicks and Logos: Design in Everyday Life, Oxford University Press, Oxford (2002)
- Philips: A Study of the Corporate Management of Design, Trefoil Publications, London / Rizzoli, New York (1989)
- Design in Germany 1870-1918, Trefoil Press, London and Taplinger, New York (1986)
- Industrial Design, Thames & Hudson, London (1980). Translated into Spanish as Breve historia del diseño industrial, Portuguese as Desenho industrial, Japanese as インダストリアル.デザインの歴史, Korean, Dutch as Industriële vormgeving and Italian.

Books (As Editor)

- Very Hong Kong: design 1997-2007, with Hong Kong Design Centre and Hong Kong Trade Development Centre (2007)
- Designed in Hong Kong, with Hong Kong Trade Development Council, Hong Kong (2004).

Reports

- Design In Asia: Review of national design policies and business use of design in China, South Korea and Taiwan (2005). Research report commissioned by the Design Council, UK as a contribution to Sir George Cox’s report to the Chancellor of the Exchequer on the future of design in the United Kingdom
- Shaping the Future: Design for Hong Kong: Report of the Design Education Task Force, Hong Kong Design Centre and Hong Kong Trade Development Centre (2003).
