= Penny Sparke =

British writer and academic

- Born: 6 November 1948 (age 77)
- Education: University of Sussex, University of Brighton
- Occupation: Art historian

Penelope Anne "Penny" Sparke (born 6 November 1948) is a British writer and academic specialising in the history of design. She has been Professor of Design History at Kingston University, London, since 1999, where she is also Director of the Modern Interiors Research Centre.

== Early life and education ==
Sparke was born on 6 November 1948 in London, England. She studied French Literature at Sussex University between 1967 and 1971, graduating with a Bachelor of Arts (BA) degree. She remained at Sussex to undertake a Postgraduate Certificate in Education (PGCE), which she completed in 1972. She undertook postgraduate research at Brighton Polytechnic, and completed her Doctor of Philosophy (PhD) degree in Design History in 1975. Her doctoral thesis was titled Theory and design in the age of pop. Sparke was awarded an honorary degree from the University for the Creative Arts in 2016.

== Academic career ==
From 1975 to 1982, Sparke was a lecturer in design history at Brighton Polytechnic (now the University of Brighton). She was then a lecturer in design history at the Royal College of Art in London between 1982 and 1999. In 1999, she joined Kingston University, London, where she had been appointed Professor of Design History. She additionally served as Dean of its Faculty of Art, Design and Music from 1999 to 2005, and as Pro-Vice Chancellor (Research and Enterprise) from 2005 to 2014.

Sparke has written 15 books about Twentieth-Century Design. She has also curated a number of exhibitions, including The Plastics Age at the Victoria and Albert Museum in London in 1990. Her areas of specialism include design history, history of the modern interior, and design and gender. In 2010, Sparke’s book The Genius of Design was published to accompany a 5-part BBC Two television series under the same title which was broadcast in 2009.

=== Other work ===
In 2007, Sparke, worked as a consultant for Pyrex helping with the communication project for their new cookware range designed by George Sowden.

She was previously the Course Director of the V&A Museum/Royal College of Art Postgraduate History of Design Programme.

Sparke is Chair of the Editorial Board for the Journal of Design History, published by the Design History Society.

== Selected works ==
- 1982 Ettore Sottsass Jnr. Design Council ISBN 0-85072-126-1
- 1983 Consultant Design: The History and Practice of the Designer in Industry, Pembridge Press ISBN 0-8620-6007-9
- 1986 An Introduction to Design and Culture in the 20th Century, Allen and Unwin, ISBN 0-04-701014-2
- 1986 Modern Furniture, Bell and Hyman ISBN 0-7135-2630-0
- 1986 Japanese Design, Michael Joseph ISBN 0-7181-2875-3
- 1987 Electrical Appliances, Bell and Hyman, ISBN 0-7135-2738-2
- 1987 Design in Context, Bloomsbury, ISBN 0-7475-0072-X
- 1988 Italian Design, from 1870 to the present, Thames and Hudson ISBN 0-500-23531-7
- 1995 As Long As It’s Pink: The Sexual Politics of Taste, Pandora ISBN 0-04-440923-0
- 1998 A Century of Design: Design Pioneers of the Twentieth-Century, Mitchell Beazley, ISBN 1-84000-403-7
- 2001 Design Directory: Great Britain, Howard ISBN 1-86205-330-8
- 2002 A Century of Car Design, Mitchell Beazley, ISBN 1-84000-403-7
- 2004 An Introduction to Design and Culture: 1900 to the present, Routledge, ISBN 978-0-415-26336-8
- 2005 Elsie de Wolfe: The Birth of Modern Interior Decoration, Acanthus Press, ISBN 0-926494-27-9
- 2008 The Modern Interior, Reaktion Books, ISBN 978-1-86189-372-7
- 2010 The Genius of Design, Quadrille Publishing Ltd, ISBN 978-1-84400-753-0
