= Visual design elements and principles =

Visual design elements and principles may refer to:

- Design elements
- Design principles
