= Susan Yelavich =

American design writer, curator

Susan Yelavich is a design scholar, critic, curator and professor emerita of design studies at Parsons School of Design, The New School, New York City.

== Career ==
=== Academic ===
Yelavich was director of the MA design studies program at Parsons from 2012 to 2018. She is a member of Scientific Committee for Design at the Polytechnic University of Milan; and has taught frequently in Poland under the auspices of the New School's Transregional Center for Democratic Studies in Wroclaw, the School of Form in Poznan, and the Academy of Fine Arts in Warsaw, with the support of the Adam Mickiewicz Institute.

=== Curator ===
Among the exhibitions she curated are: Inside Design Now, the 2003 National Triennial at the Smithsonian's Cooper Hewitt Design Museum, where she worked from 1977 to 2002, as well as the exhibition Deep Surface: Contemporary Ornament and Pattern, which she co-curated with Denise Gonzales Crisp in 2011 at the Contemporary Art Museum of Raleigh, NC.

== Awards ==
In 2018, Yelavich was awarded a Fellowship at the Bogliasco Foundation in Liguria and in 2003 she was awarded the Rome Prize and became a fellow of the American Academy in Rome. She is the author of numerous articles and books, including Thinking Design through Literature with a foreword by Paola Antonelli (Routledge, 2019); Design as Future-Making co-edited with Barbara Adams (Bloomsbury, 2014); and Contemporary World Interiors (Phaidon, 2007), which discussed over 500 projects and was translated into German, French, and Italian. Her first book, The Edge of the Millennium: An International Critique of Architecture, Urban Planning, Product and Communication Design (Whitney Library of Design, 1993), received a Federal Design Achievement award.

== Personal life ==
Yelavich is married to an artist, Michael Casey with whom she had a son, Henry T. Casey, who is also a writer. She lives in New York.

== Bibliography ==
=== Books written ===
- Yelavich, Susan. Thinking Design through Literature (https://www.routledge.com/Thinking-Design-Through-Literature-1st-Edition/Yelavich/p/book/9781138712560) ISBN 9781138712560
- Yelavich, Susan, and Stephen Doyle. Design for Life: The Collections of the National Design Museum. New York, NY: Rizzoli, 1997. ISBN 9780847820306
- Yelavich, Susan. Contemporary World Interiors. UK: Phaidon Press, 2009. ISBN 9780714843360
  - German translation, by Holger Wölfle Innenarchitektur weltweit Berlin : Phaidon, 2008 ISBN 9780714899749
  - French translation, by Laure Bataillou and Marianne Bouvier, Architecture intérieure du monde contemporain Paris : Phaidon, DL 2008 ISBN 9780714858302
  - Italian translation, Architettura d'interni contemporanea London; New York: Phaidon, 2008 ISBN 9780714859217

=== Books edited ===
- Yelavich, Susan, ed. The Edge of the Millennium: An International Critique of Architecture, Urban Planning, Product and Communication Design. New York, N.Y.: Whitney Library of Design, 1993. ISBN 9780823002542
- Yelavich, Susan, and Barbara Adams. eds. Design As Future-Making. London [etc.]: Bloomsbury Academic, 2017. ISBN 9780857858382
- Susan Yelavich, ed. Profile: Pentagram Design. London: Phaidon, 2004. ISBN 9780714843773

=== Select chapters and forewords ===
- Kleinman, Kent, Joanna Merwood-Salisbury, and Lois Weinthal, eds. After Taste: Expanded Practice in Interior Design. New York: Princeton Architectural Press, 2012. . ISBN 9781616891398
- “Product(ive) Leisure,” in proceedings of FAIR Design Conference on Design Theory and Criticism,” Academy of Fine Arts Warsaw, 2017
- Griffith Winton, Alexa and Schneiderman, Deborah, eds. Foreword, Textile Technology and Design: From Interior Space to Outer Space, London: Bloomsbury, 2016. . ISBN 9781472523754
