= Design methods =

Set of procedures, techniques, aids, or tools for designing

Design methods are procedures, techniques, aids, or tools for designing. They offer a number of different kinds of activities that a designer might use within an overall design process. Conventional procedures of design, such as drawing, can be regarded as design methods, but since the 1950s new procedures have been developed that are more usually grouped under the name of "design methods". What design methods have in common is that they "are attempts to make public the hitherto private thinking of designers; to externalise the design process".

Design methodology is the broader study of method in design: the study of the principles, practices and procedures of designing.

== Background ==
Design methods originated in new approaches to problem solving developed in the mid-20th Century, and also in response to industrialisation and mass-production, which changed the nature of designing. A "Conference on Systematic and Intuitive Methods in Engineering, Industrial Design, Architecture and Communications", held in London in 1962 is regarded as a key event marking the beginning of what became known within design studies as the "design methods movement", leading to the founding of the Design Research Society and influencing design education and practice. Leading figures in this movement in the UK were J. Christopher Jones at the University of Manchester and L. Bruce Archer at the Royal College of Art.

The movement developed through further conferences on new design methods in the UK and USA in the 1960s. The first books on rational design methods, and on creative methods also appeared in this period.

New approaches to design were developing at the same time in Germany, notably at the Ulm School of Design (Hochschule für Gestaltung–HfG Ulm) (1953–1968) under the leadership of Tomás Maldonado. Design teaching at Ulm integrated design with science (including social sciences) and introduced new fields of study such as cybernetics, systems theory and semiotics into design education. Bruce Archer also taught at Ulm, and another influential teacher was Horst Rittel. In 1963 Rittel moved to the School of Architecture at the University of California, Berkeley, where he helped found the Design Methods Group, a society focused on developing and promoting new methods especially in architecture and planning.

At the end of the 1960s two influential, but quite different works were published: Herbert A. Simon's The Sciences of the Artificial and J. Christopher Jones's Design Methods. Simon proposed the "science of design" as "a body of intellectually tough, analytic, partly formalizable, partly empirical, teachable doctrine about the design process", whereas Jones catalogued a variety of approaches to design, both rational and creative, within a context of a broad, futures creating, systems view of design.

The 1970s saw some reaction against the rationality of design methods, notably from two of its pioneers, Christopher Alexander and J. Christopher Jones. Fundamental issues were also raised by Rittel, who characterised design and planning problems as wicked problems, un-amenable to the techniques of science and engineering, which deal with "tame" problems. The criticisms turned some in the movement away from rationalised approaches to design problem solving and towards "argumentative", participatory processes in which designers worked in partnership with the problem stakeholders (clients, customers, users, the community). This led to participatory design, user centered design and the role of design thinking as a creative process in problem solving and innovation.

However, interest in systematic and rational design methods continued to develop strongly in engineering design during the 1980s; for example, through the Conference on Engineering Design series of The Design Society and the work of the Verein Deutscher Ingenieure association in Germany, and also in Japan, where the Japanese Society for the Science of Design had been established as early as 1954. Books on systematic engineering design methods were published in Germany and the UK. In the USA the American Society of Mechanical Engineers Design Engineering Division began a stream on design theory and methodology within its annual conferences. The interest in systematic, rational approaches to design has led to design science and design science (methodology) in engineering and computer science.

== Methods and processes ==
The development of design methods has been closely associated with prescriptions for a systematic process of designing. These process models usually comprise a number of phases or stages, beginning with a statement or recognition of a problem or a need for a new design and culminating in a finalised solution proposal. In his 'Systematic Method for Designers' L. Bruce Archer produced a very elaborate, 229 step model of a systematic design process for industrial design, but also a summary model consisting of three phases: Analytical phase (programming and data collection, analysis), Creative phase (synthesis, development), and Executive phase (communication). The UK's Design Council created the Double Diamond (design process model), which breaks the creative design process into four phases: Discover (insight into the problem), Define (the area to focus upon), Develop (potential solutions), and Deliver (solutions that work). A systematic model for engineering design by Pahl and Beitz has phases of Clarification of the task, Conceptual design, Embodiment design, and Detail design. A less prescriptive approach to designing a basic design process for oneself has been outlined by J. Christopher Jones.

In the engineering design process systematic models tend to be linear, in sequential steps, but acknowledging the necessity of iteration. In architectural design, process models tend to be cyclical and spiral, with iteration as essential to progression towards a final design. In industrial and product design, process models tend to comprise a sequence of stages of divergent and convergent thinking. The Dubberly Design Office has compiled examples of more than 80 design process models, but it is not an exhaustive list.

Within these process models, numerous design methods can be applied. In his book 'Design Methods' J. C. Jones grouped 26 methods according to their purposes within a design process: Methods of exploring design situations (e.g. Stating Objectives, Investigating User Behaviour, Interviewing Users), Methods of searching for ideas (e.g. Brainstorming, Synectics, Morphological Charts), Methods of exploring problem structure (e.g. Interaction Matrix, Functional Innovation, Information Sorting), Methods of evaluation (e.g. Checklists, Ranking and Weighting).

Nigel Cross outlined eight stages in a process of engineering product design, each with an associated method: Identifying Opportunities - User Scenarios; Clarifying Objectives - Objectives Tree; Establishing Functions - Function Analysis; Setting Requirements - Performance Specification; Determining Characteristics - Quality Function Deployment; Generating Alternatives - Morphological Chart; Evaluating Alternatives - Weighted Objectives; Improving Details - Value Engineering.

Many design methods still currently in use originated in the design methods movement of the 1960s and 70s, adapted to modern design practices. Recent developments have seen the introduction of more qualitative techniques, including ethnographic methods such as cultural probes and situated methods.

== Emergence of design research and design studies ==
The design methods movement had a profound influence on the development of academic interest in design and designing and the emergence of design research and design studies. Arising directly from the 1962 Conference on Design Methods, the Design Research Society (DRS) was founded in the UK in 1966. The purpose of the Society is to promote "the study of and research into the process of designing in all its many fields" and is an interdisciplinary group with many professions represented.

In the USA, a similar Design Methods Group (DMG) was also established in 1966 by Horst Rittel and others at the University of California, Berkeley. The DMG held a conference at MIT in 1968 with a focus on environmental design and planning, and that led to the foundation of the Environmental Design Research Association (EDRA), which held its first conference in 1969. A group interested in design methods and theory in architecture and engineering formed at MIT in the early 1980s, including Donald Schön, who was studying the working practices of architects, engineers and other professionals and developing his theory of reflective practice. In 1984 the National Science Foundation created a Design Theory and Methodology Program to promote methods and process research in engineering design.

Meanwhile in Europe, Vladimir Hubka established the Workshop Design-Konstruction (WDK), which led to a series of International Conferences on Engineering Design (ICED) beginning in 1981 and later became the Design Society.

Academic research journals in design also began publication. DRS initiated Design Studies in 1979, Design Issues appeared in 1984, and Research in Engineering Design in 1989.

== Influence on all professional design practice ==
Several pioneers of design methods developed their work in association with industry. The Ulm school established a significant partnership with the German consumer products company Braun through their designer Dieter Rams. J. Christopher Jones began his approach to systematic design as an ergonomist at the electrical engineering company AEI. L. Bruce Archer developed his systematic approach in projects for medical equipment for the UK National Health Service.

In the USA, designer Henry Dreyfuss had a profound impact on the practice of industrial design by developing systematic processes and promoting the use of anthropometrics, ergonomics and human factors in design, including through his 1955 book 'Designing for People'. Another successful designer, Jay Doblin, was also influential on the theory and practice of design as a systematic process.

Much of current design practice has been influenced and guided by design methods. For example, the influential IDEO consultancy uses design methods extensively in its 'Design Kit' and 'Method Cards'. Increasingly, the intersections of design methods with business and government through the application of design thinking have been championed by numerous consultancies within the design profession. Wide influence has also come through Christopher Alexander's pattern language method, originally developed for architectural and urban design, which has been adopted in software design, interaction design, pedagogical design and other domains.

== See also ==
- Design management
- Design rationale
- Design research
- Design science
- Design theory
- Design thinking

== Other sources (not cited above) ==
- Ko, A. J. Design Methods. https://faculty.washington.edu/ajko/books/design-methods/index.html
- Koberg, D. and J. Bagnall. (1972) The Universal Traveler: A Soft-Systems Guide to Creativity, Problem-Solving, and the Process of Design. Los Altos, CA: Kaufmann. 2nd edition (1981): The All New Universal Traveler: A Soft-Systems Guide to Creativity, Problem-Solving, and the Process of Reaching Goals.
- Krippendorff, K. (2006). The Semantic Turn; A New Foundation for Design. Taylor&Francis, CRC Press, USA. ISBN 978-0415779890
- Plowright, P. (2014) Revealing Architectural Design: Methods, Frameworks and Tools. Routledge, UK. ISBN 978-0415639026
- Protzen, J-P. and D. J. Harris. (2010) The Universe of Design: Horst Rittel's Theories of Design and Planning. Routledge. ISBN 0415779898
- Pugh, S. (1991), Total Design: Integrated Methods for Successful Product Engineering. Addison-Wesley, UK.
- Roozenburg, N. and J. Eekels. (1991) Product Design: Fundamentals and Methods. Wiley, UK. ISBN 0471943517
- Ulrich, K. and S. Eppinger. (2011) Product Design and Development. McGraw Hill, USA. ISBN 978-0073404776
