= Tony Fry =

Australian designer

Philosophical work
- Era: Contemporary design theory
- Region: British/Australian
- Main interests: Design · Ontology · Sustainability · Technology
- Notable ideas: Sustainment, Defuturing, Futuring, Redirective Practice, The Age of Unsettlement, The Urmadic University

Tony Fry is a designer, design theorist, and cultural theorist.

Fry has taught design and cultural theory in Britain, the United States, Hong Kong and Australia and holds a PhD in Cultural Studies in Design from the University of Birmingham. Fry has held positions as Adjunct Professor to the Faculty of Design, Architecture and Building at the University of Technology Sydney and as a consultant on sustainable design to the School of the Art Institute of Chicago. He is former Professor and Convenor, Master of Design Futures Program, Griffith University, Queensland College of Art. Fry currently holds visiting an adjunct position at the University of Tasmania, and is visiting professor University of Ibagué (Colombia).

He was a contributing editor of Design Philosophy Papers journal and principal of The Studio at the Edge of the World.

== Bibliography ==
- Design history Australia: a source text in methods and resources. (1988}
- Old Worlds, New Visions (1989)
- Green Desires: Ecology, Design, Products (1992)
- RUA/TV?: Heidegger and the Televisual (1993)
- Remakings (1994)
- Waste Not Waste (1996)
- A New Design Philosophy: An Introduction to Defuturing (1999)
- Design Futuring: Sustainability, Ethics, and New Practice (2009)
- "Food in the Age of Unsettlement". Griffith Review. 27: 41–45. Autumn 2010.
- Design as Politics (2011)
- Becoming Human by Design (2012)
- City Futures in the Age of a Changing Climate (2014)
- Design and the Question of History (2015)
- Remaking Cities: An Introduction to Urban Metrofitting (2017)
- Unstaging War, Confronting Conflict and Peace (2019)
- Defuturing A New Design Philosophy (2020)
- (Tony Fry and Madina Tlostanov), A New Political Imagination, Making the Case (2021)
- Writing Design Fiction, Relocating a City in Crisis (2022)
- Evil, Madness and Truth, Gerda's Story (2024)
