= Design thinking =

Processes by which design concepts are developed

Design thinking refers to the set of cognitive, strategic and practical procedures used by designers in the process of designing, and to the body of knowledge that has been developed about how people reason when engaging with design problems.

Design thinking is also associated with prescriptions for the innovation of products and services within business and social contexts.

== Background ==
Design thinking has a history extending from the 1950s and '60s, with roots in the study of design cognition and design methods. It has also been referred to as "designerly ways of knowing, thinking and acting" and as "designerly thinking". Many of the key concepts and aspects of design thinking have been identified through studies, across different design domains, of design cognition and design activity in both laboratory and natural contexts.

The term design thinking has been used to refer to a specific cognitive style (thinking like a designer), a general theory of design (a way of understanding how designers work), and a set of pedagogical resources (through which organisations or inexperienced designers can learn to approach complex problems in a designerly way). The different uses have given rise to some confusion in the use of the term.

== As a process of designing ==
An iterative, non-linear process, design thinking includes activities such as context analysis, user testing, problem finding and framing, ideation and solution generating, creative thinking, sketching and drawing, prototyping, and evaluating.

Core features of design thinking include the abilities to:

- deal with different types of design problems, especially ill-defined and 'wicked' problems
- adopt solution-focused strategies
- use abductive and productive reasoning
- employ non-verbal, graphic/spatial modelling media, for example, sketching and prototyping.

=== Wicked problems ===
Designing deals with design problems that can be categorized on a spectrum of types of problems from well-defined problems to ill-defined ones to problems that are wickedly difficult. In the 2010s, the category of super wicked global problems emerged as well. Wicked problems have features such as no definitive formulation, no true/false solution, and a wide discrepancy between perspectives on the situation. Horst Rittel introduced the term in the context of design and planning, and with Melvin Webber contrasted this problem type with well-defined or "tame" cases where the problem is clear and the solution available through applying rules or technical knowledge. Rittel contrasted a formal rationalistic "first generation" of design methods in the 1950s and 1960s against the need for a participatory and informally argumentative "second generation" of design methods for the 1970s and beyond that would be more adequate for the complexity of wicked problems.

=== Problem framing ===
Rather than accept the problem as given, designers explore the given problem and its context and may reinterpret or restructure the given problem in order to reach a particular framing of the problem that suggests a route to a solution.

=== Solution-focused thinking ===
In empirical studies of three-dimensional problem solving, Bryan Lawson found architects employed solution-focused cognitive strategies, distinct from the problem-focused strategies of scientists. Nigel Cross suggests that "Designers tend to use solution conjectures as the means of developing their understanding of the problem".

=== Abductive reasoning ===
In the creation of new design proposals, designers have to infer possible solutions from the available problem information, their experience, and the use of non-deductive modes of thinking such as the use of analogies. This has been interpreted as a form of Peirce's abductive reasoning, called innovative abduction.

=== Co-evolution of problem and solution ===
In the process of designing, the designer's attention typically oscillates between their understanding of the problematic context and their ideas for a solution in a process of co-evolution of problem and solution. New solution ideas can lead to a deeper or alternative understanding of the problematic context, which in turn triggers more solution ideas.

=== Representations and modelling ===
Conventionally, designers communicate mostly in visual or object languages to translate abstract requirements into concrete objects. These 'languages' include traditional sketches and drawings but also extend to computer models and physical prototypes. The use of representations and models is closely associated with features of design thinking such as the generation and exploration of tentative solution concepts, the identification of what needs to be known about the developing concept, and the recognition of emergent features and properties within the representations.

== As a process for innovation ==
Design thinking example video that presents design thinking for innovation in business and society as a process of "Learn from People, Find Patterns, Design Principles, Make Tangible and Iterate Relentlessly"

A five-phase description of the design innovation process is offered by Plattner, Meinel, and Leifer as: (re)defining the problem, needfinding and benchmarking, ideating, building, and testing. Plattner, Meinel, and Leifer state: "While the stages are simple enough, the adaptive expertise required to choose the right inflection points and appropriate next stage is a high order intellectual activity that requires practice and is learnable."

The process may also be thought of as a system of overlapping spaces rather than a sequence of orderly steps: inspiration, ideation, and implementation. Projects may loop back through inspiration, ideation, and implementation more than once as the team refines its ideas and explores new directions.

=== Inspiration ===
Generally, the design innovation process starts with the inspiration phase: observing how things and people work in the real world and noticing problems or opportunities. These problem formulations can be documented in a brief that includes constraints that give the project team a framework from which to begin, benchmarks by which they can measure progress, and a set of objectives to be realized, such as price point, available technology, and market segment.

=== Empathy ===
In their book Creative Confidence, Tom and David Kelley note the importance of empathy with clients, users, and customers as a basis for innovative design. Designers approach user research with the goal of understanding their wants and needs, what might make their life easier and more enjoyable and how technology can be useful for them. Empathic design transcends physical ergonomics to include understanding the psychological and emotional needs of people—the way they do things, why and how they think and feel about the world, and what is meaningful to them.

=== Ideation: divergent and convergent thinking ===
Ideation is idea generation. The process is characterized by the alternation of divergent and convergent thinking, typical of design thinking process.

To achieve divergent thinking, it may be important to involve a diverse group of people in the process. Design teams typically begin with a structured brainstorming process of "thinking outside the box". Convergent thinking, on the other hand, aims to zoom in and focus on different proposals to select the best choice, allowing the design thinking process to continue towards achieving the final goals.

After collecting and sorting many ideas, a team goes through a process of pattern finding and synthesis in which it translates ideas into insights that can lead to solutions or opportunities for change. These might include visions of new product offerings or choices among various ways of creating new experiences.

=== Implementation and prototyping ===
The third space of the design thinking innovation process is implementation, when the best ideas generated during ideation are turned into something concrete.

At the core of the implementation process is prototyping: turning ideas into actual products and services that are then tested, evaluated, iterated, and refined. A prototype, or even a rough mock-up helps to gather feedback and improve the idea. Prototypes can speed up the process of innovation because they allow quick identification of strengths and weaknesses of proposed solutions, and can prompt new ideas.

== Applications ==
In the 2000s and 2010s there was a significant growth of interest in applying design thinking across a range of diverse fields. Its applications extended into business as a catalyst for gaining competitive advantage within business, in education where it has been used to develop or improve teaching methods, and in healthcare to develop human-centered solutions to healthcare-related problems. However, some critics question design thinking as a panacea to universal innovation.

=== In business ===
Historically, designers tended to be involved only in the later parts of the process of new product development, focusing their attention on the aesthetics and functionality of products. Many businesses and other organisations now realise the utility of embedding design as a productive asset throughout organisational policies and practices, and design thinking has been used to help many different types of business and social organisations to be more constructive and innovative. Designers bring their methods into business either by taking part themselves from the earliest stages of product and service development processes or by training others to use design methods and to build innovative thinking capabilities within organisations.

=== In education ===
All forms of professional design education can be assumed to be developing design thinking in students, even if only implicitly, but design thinking is also now explicitly taught in general as well as professional education, across all sectors of education. Design as a subject was introduced into secondary schools' educational curricula in the UK in the 1970s, gradually replacing and/or developing from some of the traditional art and craft subjects, and increasingly linked with technology studies. This development sparked related research studies in both education and design.

In the primary/secondary K–12 education sector, design thinking is used to enhance learning and promote creative thinking, teamwork, and student responsibility for learning. A design-based approach to teaching and learning has been developed more widely throughout education.

New courses in design thinking have also been introduced at the university level, especially when linked with business and innovation studies. A notable early course of this type was introduced at Stanford University in 2003, the Hasso Plattner Institute of Design, known as the d.school. Design thinking can now be seen in International Baccalaureate schools across the world, and in Maker Education organizations.

=== In healthcare ===
Design thinking in healthcare mainly focuses on creating improved, human-centered products and services, but also extends into creating better environments and novel delivery methods.

=== Criticisms ===
Some of the diverse and popularized applications of design thinking, particularly in business innovation, have been criticized for promoting a very restricted interpretation of design skills and abilities. Lucy Kimbell accused business applications of design thinking of "de-politicizing managerial practice" through an "undertheorized" conception of design thinking. Lee Vinsel suggested that popular purveyors of design consulting "as a reform for all of higher education" misuse ideas from the fields that they purport to borrow from, and devalue discipline-specific expertise, giving students "'creative confidence' without actual capabilities".

Natasha Iskander criticized a certain conception of design thinking for reaffirming "the privileged role of the designer" at the expense of the communities that the designer serves, and argued that the concept of "empathy" employed in some formulations of design thinking ignores critical reflection on the way identity and power shape empathetic identification. She claimed that promoting simplified versions of design thinking "makes it hard to solve challenges that are characterized by a high degree of uncertainty—like climate change—where doing things the way we always have done them is a sure recipe for disaster". Similarly, Rebecca Ackermann said that radical broadening of design thinking elevated the designer into "a kind of spiritual medium" whose claimed empathy skills could be allowed to supersede context-specific expertise within professional domains, and suggested that "many big problems are rooted in centuries of dark history, too deeply entrenched to be obliterated with a touch of design thinking's magic wand".

== History ==
Drawing on psychological studies of creativity from the 1940s, such as Max Wertheimer's "Productive Thinking" (1945), new creativity techniques in the 1950s and design methods in the 1960s led to the idea of design thinking as a particular approach to creatively solving problems. Among the first authors to write about design thinking were John E. Arnold in "Creative Engineering" (1959) and L. Bruce Archer in "Systematic Method for Designers" (1963–64).

In his book "Creative Engineering" (1959) Arnold distinguishes four areas of creative thinking: (1) novel functionality, i.e. solutions that satisfy a novel need or solutions that satisfy an old need in an entirely new way, (2) higher performance levels of a solution, (3) lower production costs or (4) increased salability. Arnold recommended a balanced approach—product developers should seek opportunities in all four areas of design thinking: "It is rather interesting to look over the developmental history of any product or family of products and try to classify the changes into one of the four areas ... Your group, too, might have gotten into a rut and is inadvertently doing all of your design thinking in one area and is missing good bets in other areas."

Although L. Bruce Archer's "Systematic Method for Designers" (1963–64) was concerned primarily with a systematic process of designing, it also expressed a need to broaden the scope of conventional design: "Ways have had to be found to incorporate knowledge of ergonomics, cybernetics, marketing and management science into design thinking". Archer was also developing the relationship of design thinking with management: "The time is rapidly approaching when design decision making and management decision making techniques will have so much in common that the one will become no more than the extension of the other".

Arnold initiated a long history of design thinking at Stanford University, extending through many others such as Robert McKim and Rolf Faste, who taught "design thinking as a method of creative action", and continuing with the shift from creative engineering to innovation management in the 2000s. Design thinking was adapted for business purposes by Faste's Stanford colleague David M. Kelley, who founded the design consultancy IDEO in 1991.

Bryan Lawson's 1980 book How Designers Think, primarily addressing design in architecture, began a process of generalising the concept of design thinking. A 1982 article by Nigel Cross, "Designerly Ways of Knowing", established some of the intrinsic qualities and abilities of design thinking that also made it relevant in general education and thus for wider audiences. Peter G. Rowe's 1987 book Design Thinking, which described methods and approaches used by architects and urban planners, was a significant early usage of the term in the design research literature. An international series of research symposia in design thinking began at Delft University of Technology in 1991. Richard Buchanan's 1992 article "Wicked Problems in Design Thinking" expressed a broader view of design thinking as addressing intractable human concerns through design, reprising ideas that Rittel and Webber developed in the early 1970s.

=== Timeline ===
pre-1960	The origins of design thinking lie in the development of psychological studies on creativity in the 1940s and the development of creativity techniques in the 1950s.
1960s	The first notable books on methods of creativity are published by William J. J. Gordon (1961) and Alex Faickney Osborn (1963). The 1962 Conference on Systematic and Intuitive Methods in Engineering, Industrial Design, Architecture and Communications, London, UK, catalyses interest in studying design processes and developing new design methods. Books on methods and theories of design in different fields are published by Morris Asimow (1962) (engineering), L. Bruce Archer (1963–64) (industrial design), Christopher Alexander (1964) (architecture), and John Chris Jones (1970) (product and systems design).
1970s	Don Koberg and Jim Bagnall pioneer a 'soft systems' design process for dealing with the problems of 'everyday life' in their book The Universal Traveler. Horst Rittel and Melvin Webber publish "Dilemmas in a General Theory of Planning" showing that many design and planning problems are wicked problems as opposed to "tame", single disciplinary, problems of science. L. Bruce Archer extends inquiry into designerly ways of knowing, claiming: "There exists a designerly way of thinking and communicating that is both different from scientific and scholarly ways of thinking and communicating, and as powerful as scientific and scholarly methods of inquiry when applied to its own kinds of problems."
1980s	The 1980s bring the rise of human-centered design and the rise of design-centered business management. Donald Schön publishes The Reflective Practitioner in which he aims to establish "an epistemology of practice implicit in the artistic, intuitive processes that [design and other] practitioners bring to situations of uncertainty, instability, uniqueness and value conflict".
1990s	The first symposium on Research in Design Thinking is held at Delft University, The Netherlands, in 1991. IDEO design consultancy is formed by combining three industrial design companies. They are one of the first design companies to showcase their design process, based on design methods and design thinking.
2000s	The start of the 21st century brings a significant increase in interest in design thinking as the term becomes popularized in the business press. Books about how to create a more design-focused workplace where innovation can thrive are written for the business sector by, amongst others, Richard Florida (2002), Daniel Pink (2006), Roger Martin (2007), Tim Brown (2009), Thomas Lockwood (2010), Vijay Kumar (2012). The design approach also becomes extended and adapted to tackle the design of services, marking the beginning of the service design movement. Stanford University's d.school begins to teach design thinking as a generalisable approach to technical and social innovation.
2010s	Criticisms appear of inflated claims for the role and importance of the business-oriented versions of design thinking and of its wider relevance. However, in the Harvard Business Review Jeanne Liedtka claims "design thinking works" in business.
2020s	The business bubble bursts. In a review article, Nigel Cross distinguishes the two versions (within design and within business) as DesignThinking 1 and 2, and concludes that, because of the popular dominance of the business version, the original (design-based) DesignThinking 1 may have to adopt the term 'designerly thinking'.

== See also ==
- Creativity techniques
- Lateral thinking
- Reflective practice
- Systems thinking
- User experience

Lists

- List of thought processes
- List of creative thought processes
