= Design research =

Research for improving design and design methods

Design research was originally constituted as primarily concerned with ways of supporting and improving the process of design, developing from work in design methods. The concept has been expanded to include research embedded within the process of design and research-based design practice, research into the cognitive and communal processes of designing, and extending into wider aspects of socio-political, ethical and environmental contexts of design. It retains a sense of generality, recognising design as a creative act common to many fields, and aimed at understanding design processes and practices quite broadly.

== Origins ==
Design research emerged as a recognisable field of study in the 1960s, initially marked by a conference on Design methods at Imperial College London, in 1962. It led to the founding of the Design Research Society (DRS) in 1966. John Christopher Jones (one of the initiators of the 1962 conference) founded a postgraduate Design Research Laboratory at the University of Manchester Institute of Science and Technology, and L. Bruce Archer supported by Misha Black founded the postgraduate Department of Design Research at the Royal College of Art, London, becoming the first Professor of Design Research.

The Design Research Society has always stated its aim as: ‘to promote the study of and research into the process of designing in all its many fields’. Its purpose therefore is to act as a form of learned society, taking a scholarly and domain independent view of the process of designing.

Some of the origins of design methods and design research lay in the emergence after the 2nd World War of operational research methods and management decision-making techniques, the development of creativity techniques in the 1950s, and the beginnings of computer programs for problem solving in the 1960s. A statement by Bruce Archer encapsulated what was going on: ‘The most fundamental challenge to conventional ideas on design has been the growing advocacy of systematic methods of problem solving, borrowed from computer techniques and management theory, for the assessment of design problems and the development of design solutions.’ Herbert A. Simon established the foundations for ‘a science of design’, which would be ‘a body of intellectually tough, analytic, partly formalizable, partly empirical, teachable doctrine about the design process.’

== Early work ==
Early work was mainly within the domains of architectural design and industrial design. Research in engineering design developed strongly in the 1980s, for example, through ICED—the series of International Conferences on Engineering Design, now run by The Design Society. These developments were especially strong in Germany and Japan. In the USA there were also some important developments in design theory and methodology, including the publications of the Design Methods Group and the series of conferences of the Environmental Design Research Association. The National Science Foundation initiative on design theory and methods led to substantial growth in engineering design research in the late-1980s. A particularly significant development was the emergence of the first journals of design research: Design Studies in 1979, Design Issues in 1984, and Research in Engineering Design in 1989.

== Development ==
The development of design research has led to the establishment of design as a coherent discipline of study in its own right, based on the view that design has its own things to know and its own ways of knowing them. Bruce Archer again encapsulated the view in stating his new belief that ‘there exists a designerly way of thinking and communicating that is both different from scientific and scholarly ways of thinking and communicating, and as powerful as scientific and scholarly methods of enquiry when applied to its own kinds of problems’. This view was developed further in a series of papers by Nigel Cross, collected as a book on 'Designerly Ways of Knowing'. Significantly, Donald Schön promoted the new view within his book The Reflective Practitioner, in which he challenged the technical rationality of Simon and sought to establish ‘an epistemology of practice implicit in the artistic, intuitive processes which [design and other] practitioners bring to situations of uncertainty, instability, uniqueness and value conflict’.

Design research ‘came of age’ in the 1980s, and has continued to expand. This was helped by the development of a research base, including doctoral programmes, within many of the design schools located within new institutions that were previously art colleges, and the emergence of new areas such as interaction design. More new journals have appeared, such as The Design Journal, the Journal of Design Research, CoDesign and more recently Design Science. There has also been a major growth in conferences, with not only a continuing series by DRS, but also series such as Design Thinking, Doctoral Education in Design, Design Computing and Cognition, Design and Emotion, the European Academy, the Asian Design Conferences, etc. Design research now operates on an international scale, acknowledged in the cooperation of DRS with the Asian design research societies in the founding in 2005 of the International Association of Societies of Design Research.

== See also ==
- Action research
- Contextual inquiry
- Design Research Society
- Design science
- Design studies
- Design theory
- Reflective practice
- User-centered design
