= Richard Buchanan (academic) =

American academic

George Richard Buchanan is a professor of design, management, and information systems. Currently he teaches at the Weatherhead School of Management at Case Western Reserve University. Previously he was the head of the Carnegie Mellon School of Design. He serves as an editor of Design Issues and is a past President of the Design Research Society.

Buchanan is one of the first people to talk about "Fourth Order of Design" as described in his paper "Design Research and the New Learning" (2001) and he is known for extending the application of design into new areas of theory and practice, writing, and teaching as well as practicing the concepts and methods of interaction design.

In 2009, Buchanan received an honorary doctorate from the Faculté de l’aménagement (Environmental Design Faculty) at the University of Montréal.

He is an editor of the following books:

- Buchanan, Richard, and Victor Margolin. Discovering Design: Explorations in Design Studies. Chicago: University of Chicago Press, 1995.
- Buchanan, Richard, Dennis P. Doordan, and Victor Margolin. The Designed World: Images, Objects, Environments. Oxford: Berg, 2010.
- Buchanan, Richard, and Victor Margolin. The Idea of Design: A Design Issues Reader. Cambridge, Massachusetts : MIT Press, 1995

He has published several articles on design theory and research, particularly on Interaction design and organizational design.

- "Wicked Problems in Design Thinking", 1992
- "Declaration By Design: Rhetoric, Argument, and Demonstration in Design Practice", 1985
- "Human Dignity and Human Rights: Thoughts on the Principles of Human-Centered Design", 2001
- "Design Research and the New Learning", 2001
