= Design Research Society =

International society supporting the design research community

- Type: Charity
- Founded: 1966; 60 years ago
- Headquarters: United Kingdom
- Area served: Worldwide
- Key people: John Chris Jones, L. Bruce Archer, Nigel Cross
- Website: www.designresearchsociety.org

The Design Research Society (DRS), founded in the United Kingdom in 1966, is an international society for developing and supporting the interests of the design research community. The primary purpose of the DRS, as embodied in its first statement of rules, is to promote 'the study of and research into the process of designing in all its many fields'. This established the intention of being an interdisciplinary learned society, taking a scholarly and domain independent view of the process of designing. Membership is open to anyone interested in design research, and members with established experience and a strong background in design research may apply to be elected as a DRS Fellow.

== Origins ==
The origins of the Society lay in the first conference on design methods, (full title "The Conference on Systematic and Intuitive Methods in Engineering, Industrial Design, Architecture and Communications") held at Imperial College in London in 1962, which enabled a core of people to be identified who shared interests in new approaches to the process of designing.

== Early history ==
Initially, the DRS promoted its aims through a series of one-day conferences and the publication of a quarterly newsletter to members. However, within a few years, unsuccessful attempts to establish a published journal and fruitless internal debate about the Society's goals led to inactivity. The Society was revived by its first major international conference, on design participation, held in Manchester in 1971. At that conference a meeting of DRS members led to a call for a special general meeting of the Society, and to changes of officers and council members. Subsequently, a series of conferences was held through the 1970s and 80s: in London (1973), Portsmouth (1976, 1980), Istanbul (1978), and Bath (1984).

In the mid-1970s DRS also collaborated with the Design Methods Group, based in the USA, including publishing a joint journal, Design Research and Methods.

The DRS has had four honorary Presidents; Bruce Archer, 1992-00; Richard Buchanan 2000-06, Nigel Cross 2006- 17; Rachel Cooper 2017 to the present.

== Publications and conferences ==
By the late 1970s there was enough enthusiasm, and evidence of design research activity around the world, for the DRS to approach IPC Press (now Elsevier Science) with a successful proposal for its own journal. Design Studies, the international journal for design research, was launched in 1979. A monthly internet news bulletin DesignResearchNews was started in 1998 and has over 9000 subscribers. Between 2006 and 2009 the Society also published a quarterly newsletter, Design Research Quarterly.

A new biennial series of DRS conferences began in 2002 with the 'Common Ground' conference in London. Subsequent ones have been held at venues around the world, with a variety of themes. See the Table below. In 2005 DRS was one of the founding members of the International Association of Societies of Design Research (IASDR), which also holds biennial, international conferences. In 2020, as a result of the COVID-19 pandemic, the conference that was due to be hosted by Griffith University in Brisbane was converted to a virtual event. In 2022, it was held as a hybrid event.

Year and Theme	Hosting Institution
DRS London 2002: Commonground	Brunel University, London, UK
DRS Melbourne 2004: Futureground	Monash University, Melbourne, Australia
DRS Lisbon 2006: Wonderground	University of Lisbon, Lisbon, Portugal
DRS Sheffield 2008: Undisciplined!	Sheffield Hallam University, Sheffield, UK
DRS Montreal 2010: Design & Complexity	Université de Montréal, Montréal, Canada
DRS Bangkok 2012: Re:Search	Chulalongkorn University, Bangkok, Thailand
DRS Umeå 2014: Design's Big Debates	Umeå University, Umeå, Sweden
DRS Brighton 2016: Design + Research + Society - Future-Focused Thinking	University of Brighton, Brighton, UK
DRS Limerick 2018: Catalyst	University of Limerick, Limerick, Ireland
DRS Virtual 2020: Synergy	Griffith University, Brisbane, Australia
DRS Bilbao 2022	Universidad del País Vasco, Bilbao, Spain
DRS Boston 2024: Resistance, Recovery, Reflection, Reimagination	Northeastern University, Boston, USA

== Design Studies and Elsevier controversy ==
In 1995, Design Studies was acquired by the Dutch publishing company Elsevier. As of 2023, the journal received around 600 paper submissions annually and published around 35 papers per year, with an impact factor of 3.85. In February 2023, Elsevier informed the Editor-In-Chief, Peter Lloyd, that the journal needed to increase its acceptance rate, or risk closure, with the expectation that it needed to publish approximately 250 papers per year (translating to an acceptance rate of around 40%). To facilitate growth, without compromising the quality of the journal, the editorial board agreed to increase publication to around 50 papers annually.

On June 2, 2023, the editors were notified that Elsevier had installed a new Editor-in-Chief, prompting the Society to issue a statement condemning this action on the basis that they had not been consulted and that the new editor was not a member of the DRS, as was the journal's practice. On July 6, 2023, the DRS Executive Board issued a statement condemning Elsevier's interference, and its treatment of Editor-in-Chief, Peter Lloyd. Elsevier's actions received widespread condemnation from the academic community, many of whom drew comparisons with the controversy earlier that year surrounding Neuroimage, another prestigious academic journal in Elsevier's stable.

On July 10, 2023, Peter Lloyd resigned as the Editor-in-Chief of Design Studies along with all other editors and editorial board members. This included five editors (Associate Editors: Robin Adams, Colin Gray, Ann Heylighen; Deputy Editor: Fernando Secomandi; and Emeritus Editor in Chief Nigel Cross), and 29 members of the Editorial Board. A statement published on the Society's website explained this was due to "the unacceptable actions of Elsevier of 1) demanding a seven-fold increase in publications or facing closure; 2) appointing a new Editor-in-Chief without experience of publishing in the journal and without notification; and 3) changing the scope of the journal without consultation either with the editorial team or the Design Research Society."

== Special Interest Groups ==
Special Interest Groups provide a forum for specific areas of research which are of interest to the Design Research Community and its members. SIGs organise events and discussion in a number of ways to facilitate the exchange and development of best practice in the field. Each SIG is organised by a convenor who is supported by an organising group and the SIG members. DRS members are invited to join any Special Interest Group to contribute actively to research in the subject area of their chosen group.

=== Special Interest Group on Experiential Knowledge (EKSIG) ===
EKSIG is concerned with the understanding and role of knowledge in research and professional practice in design in order to clarify fundamental principles and practices of using design practice within research both with regard to research regulations and requirements, and research methodology.

The main aims of EKSIG are:

- Investigate and advance the understanding of 'knowledge' and 'contribution to knowledge' in design research, especially in areas where designing forms part of the research process
- Develop principles and criteria of research in design for employing different kinds of knowledge and means for the communication of knowledge
- Promote the implementation of such principles and criteria within current research policy to promote quality and standards in research
- Promote the implementation of such principles and criteria within research practice through the development of appropriate methodology to promote quality and best practice in research

EKSIG runs a biennial conference series, special strands at the DRS and IASDR conferences. It also runs a discussion list, which is used for announcements and debate about the core issues of knowledge and methodology in research and practice in the creative disciplines.

Year and Theme	Hosting Institution
EKSIG 2007: New Knowledge in the Creative Disciplines	University of Hertfordshire, Hatfield, UK
EKSIG 2009: Experiential Knowledge, Method and Methodology	London Metropolitan University, London, UK
EKSIG 2011: SkinDeep – Experiential Knowledge and Multi Sensory Communication	University for the Creative Arts, Farnham Castle, UK
EKSIG 2013: Knowing Inside Out - Experiential Knowledge, Expertise and Connoisseurship	Loughborough University, Loughborough, UK
EKSIG 2015: Tangible Means - experiential knowledge through materials	Design School Kolding, Kolding, Denmark

All papers selected for presentation at the conference are published in the conference proceedings: an abstract booklet with a CD or USB of the full papers and post-conference online publication, the preferred format of the DRS. Selected papers from each conference have been published in an appropriate journal as a special issue: Journal of Visual Arts Practice in 2007, Journal of Research Practice in 2010, Journal of Art and Design Education in Higher Education in 2012, Journal of Art and Design Education in Higher Education and in 2015, Journal of Research Practice .

=== Special Interest Group on Wellbeing and Happiness (SIGWELL) ===
SIGWELL focuses on bringing together designers, design researchers, landscape architects and others who aim to improve personal and societal wellbeing through design.

=== Design Pedagogy Special Interest Group (PedSIG) ===
This SIG on design pedagogy aims to bring together design researchers, teachers and practitioners, and others responsible for the delivery of design education, to clarify and develop the role of design research in providing the theoretical underpinning for design education. The DRS Design Pedagogy Special Interest Group is bringing together other research which is directed to similar ends. Design research is not an irrelevant activity living in its own little ghetto, but rather it provides the basis for the academic core of design teaching and pedagogic innovation. By that means through the provision of the next generation of designers it links into design practice. The DRS PedSIG runs special streams at DRS biannual conferences. It also organised symposia which were hosted by the Coventry University on 27 March 2009 and 28 January 2011.

In 2010, the DRS PedSIG and CUMULUS Association have join forces to develop a bi-annual international research events. The 1st International Symposium for Design Education Researchers in collaboration with: CUMULUS Association; DRS; five other international universities (which included: Aalto University, L'École de Design Nantes Atlantique, Coventry University, L'École Parsons à Paris, and Politecnico di Milano); the Lieu de Design, Chambre de commerce et d'industrie de Paris and AVA Publishing. The symposium was held in a prestigious location of fr:Bourse de commerce de Paris in May 2011. A special issue of Collection, a research journal, has been produced featuring a selection of contributions. The 2nd International Conference for Design Research Educators, DRS//CUMULUS 2013, was hosted by the Oslo and Akershus University College of Applied Sciences.

=== Special Interest Group for Objects, Practices, Experiences, Networks (OPENSIG) ===
The OPENSiG was originally launched in 2007 under the name 'Emotion, Experience and Interaction'. A special strand at the DRS conference 2008 and two successful workshops at Sheffield Hallam University (2007) and Nottingham Trent University (2010) served to define the group's interest in broad questions about human-object interactions – focusing on Objects and engaging with social Practices, which involve Experiences with/ of objects in Networks of relationship.

=== Inclusive Design Special Interest Group (Inclusive SIG) ===
The Inclusive Design Research Special Interest Group (InclusiveSIG) aims to provide an international platform for researchers, design practitioners, design educators and students, and the general public to exchange knowledge about inclusive design and to empower wider participation in design.

=== Design Research Society's Design Innovation Management Special Interest Group (DIMSIG) ===
Design Research Society's Design Innovation Management Special Interest Group (DIMSIG) in collaboration with the Design Society's Design Management Special Interest Group (DeMSIG) formed a cross-societal working party named the Design Management Academy (DMA). The Design School at Hong Kong Polytechnic hosted the first Design Management Academy international conference in June 2017.

=== Design for Policy and Governance Special Interest Group (PoGoSIG) ===
The PoGoSIG was launched in 2020. It seeks to engage academics and practitioners in the field of design for policy and governance to study "the effect of design on innovation in policy and governance". This group aims to advance the field by creating a community and developing collaborative actions in research, practice and education.

=== Sustainable Special Interest Group (SusSIG) ===
The DRS Sustainable Special Interest Group (SusSIG) aims to nurture design research debates and outcomes that are more holistic in their approach to ecological and social care.
