= Design Issues =

- Discipline: Design
- Language: English
- Edited by: Bruce Brown, Richard Buchanan, Carl DiSalvo, Dennis P. Doordan, Kipum Lee, Victor Margolin, Ramia Mazé

Publication details
- History: 1984-present
- Publisher: MIT Press
- Frequency: Quarterly

Standard abbreviations
- ISO 4: Des. Issues

Indexing
- ISSN: 0747-9360 (print); 1531-4790 (web)
- JSTOR: 07479360
- OCLC no.: 44910652

Links
- Journal homepage; Online access

Design Issues is a peer-reviewed academic journal covering design history, theory, and criticism. The journal typically includes theoretical and critical articles, book reviews, and illustrations. Design Issues was established in 1984 and is published online and in hard copy by MIT Press.

== Abstracting and indexing ==
The journal is abstracted and indexed in:

- Academic Search
- Art Abstracts
- Arts & Humanities Citation Index
- Bibliography of the History of Art
- Current Contents
- Dietrich's Index Philosophicus
- International Bibliography of Periodical Literature in the Humanities & Social Sciences
- International Bibliography of Book Reviews of Scholarly Research on the Humanities & Social Sciences
- MLA International Bibliography
- Scopus
- TOC Premier
