= Design history =

Study of objects of design in historical context

Design history is the study of objects of design in their historical and stylistic contexts. With a broad definition, the contexts of design history include the social, the cultural, the economic, the political, the technical and the aesthetic. Design history has as its objects of study all designed objects including those of architecture, fashion, crafts, interiors, textiles, graphic design, industrial design and product design. Design theorists revamp historical techniques and they use these aspects to create more sophisticated techniques of design. It acts as a tool to better future aspects of design.

Design history has had to incorporate criticism of the 'heroic' structure of its discipline in response to the establishment of material culture, much as art history has had to respond to visual culture (although visual culture has been able to broaden the subject area of art history through the incorporation of the televisual, film and new media). Design history has done this by shifting its focus towards the acts of production and consumption. The acts of production and consumption in design history were a result of the modernist approach designers started to take which advanced in the 19th century. Pre-capitalism and feudalism were the main drivers of modernism. They facilitated stylistic features and aesthetics which were exclusive because of the influence of small wealthy elites.

== Design history as a component of British practice-based courses ==
Design history also exists as a component of many practice-based courses.

The teaching and study of design history within art and design programs in Britain are one of the results of the National Advisory Council on Art Education in the 1960s. Among its aims was making art and design education a legitimate academic activity, to which ends a historical perspective was introduced. This necessitated the employment or 'buying in' of specialists from art history disciplines, leading to a particular style of delivery: "Art historians taught in the only way that art historians knew how to teach; they switched off the lights, turned on the slide projector, showed slides of art and design objects, discussed and evaluated them and asked (art and design) students to write essays – according to the scholarly conventions of academia".

The most obvious effect of the traditional approach design history as sequential, in which X begat Y and Y begat Z. This has pedagogical implications in that the realization that assessment requires a fact-based regurgitation of received knowledge leads students to ignore discussions of the situations surrounding a design's creation and reception and to focus instead on simple facts such as who designed what and when.

This 'heroic/aesthetic' view – the idea that there are a few great designers who should be studied and revered unquestioningly – arguably instills an unrealistic view of the design profession. Although the design industry has been complicit in promoting the heroic view of history, the establishment of the UK government of Creative & Cultural Skills has led to calls for design courses to be made less 'academic' and more attuned to the 'needs' of the industry. Design history, as a component of design courses, is under increasing threat in the UK at least and it has been argued that its survival depends on an increased focus on the study of the processes and effects of design rather than the lives of designers themselves.

Ultimately it appears that design history for practice-based courses is rapidly becoming a branch of social and cultural studies, leaving behind its art historical roots. This has led to a great deal of debate as the two approaches forge distinct pedagogical approaches and philosophies.

=== Debates over the merits of different approaches to teaching design history on practice-based courses ===
The debate over the best way to approach the teaching of design history to practice-based students is often heated. It is notable that the biggest push to adopt a 'realistic' approach (i.e. non-hero-based and analysing the production as well as the consumption of design that would otherwise be viewed as ephemeral) comes from teachers delivering these programmes, while critics are predominantly those who teach design history by approaching it in a more diverse and geographical standpoint.

The biggest criticism of the 'realistic' approach appears to be that it imposes anonymity on designers, while the counter argument is that the vast majority of designers are anonymous and that it is the uses and users of design that are more important.

The research literature suggests that, contrary to critics' predictions of the death of design history, this realistic approach is beneficial. Baldwin and McLean at the University of Brighton (now at the University of Dundee and Edinburgh College of Art respectively) reported attendance figures for courses using this model rising dramatically, and improved interest in the subject, as did Rain at Central St. Martin's. This compares with the often-reported low attendance and low grades of practice-based students facing the 'death by slideshow' model.

== Design history from a global perspective ==
The rise of western cultures in the 19th century facilitated the idea of European civilization as culturally advanced while disregarding non-western cultures by representing them as cultures "without history". However, an emerging global perspective of design history meant a growth in understanding design history from a global context. This led to different understandings of design history and acknowledging design's processes, production and consumption based on different cultural contexts. This was done through what is called globalization. One way of achieving this involved building on to the existing modernist knowledge from Europe and making the processes, production and consumption meet the standards of the different cultures. The problem with this approach is that it assumes that there is only one narrative of design history, limiting it to a specific place and time. Globalizing design history also means popularizing other forms of design that may not constitute as design in western countries. This means moving beyond the modernists' approaches and acknowledging other forms of design other than those based on the European understanding of production and consumption. Such practices ensure that design history from different cultures is acknowledged and is treated equally to that of the West.

Globalization has also meant that design history is no longer only viewed in the perspective of production and consumption but is now also perceived in the lens of theories, policies, social programs, opinions and organizational systems. This perspective allows for acknowledging that design is not only concerned with the materialistic or three-dimensional products, but also includes a wide range of cultural artifacts. Some of these artifacts may be understanding design history as a feature that gives humans a history of ideas on how to live and interact with each other. Aspects such as teamwork, management style and appreciation of different types of creativity are all examples of design history that demonstrate the art of living and interactions amnongst humans. Diversity acts as a form of design technique that is used to facilitate creativity. Having diverse opinions and perspectives allows for clashes of opinions which also enhance creativity and help build new knowledge. Chinese design history and design studies have taken this approach by diversifying their approach to design. Practitioners take into consideration the Chinese civilizations which include the history of arts, crafts and philosophy as well as incorporating western technologies and marketing-structures. Elsewhere, places in Southern Africa have used design techniques as a form of social communication. These areas used rock paintings as a form of communications and such communication started to advance with the development of pictographs and alphabets.

== Museums ==
- Design Museum, London, UK.
- V&A Museum, London, UK.
- Cooper Hewitt National Design Museum, Smithsonian Museum, NY, USA.

== See also ==
- Design History Society
