= Allan M. Collins =

American cognitive scientist (1936–2026)

- Born: August 7, 1937; United States
- Died: April 20, 2026 (aged 88)
- Education: University of Michigan (B.A., M.A., Ph.D.)
- Occupations: Cognitive scientist, Professor Emeritus of Learning Sciences
- Employer: Northwestern University
- Known for: Research on semantic memory, artificial intelligence, intelligent tutoring systems, cognitive apprenticeship
- Notable work: SCHOLAR CAI, WHY intelligent tutoring system
- Title: Professor Emeritus of Learning Sciences
- Awards: John Simon Guggenheim Memorial Foundation Fellowship (1974), Sloan Fellowship

Allan M. Collins (August 7, 1936 – April 20, 2026) was an American cognitive scientist, Professor Emeritus of Learning Sciences at Northwestern University's School of Education and Social Policy. His research is recognized as having broad impact on the fields of cognitive psychology, artificial intelligence, and education.

== Research contributions ==
=== Psychology ===
Collins is most well known in psychology for his foundational research on human semantic memory and cognition. Collins and colleagues, most notably M.R. Quillian and Elizabeth Loftus, developed the position that semantic knowledge is represented in stored category representations, linked together in a taxonomically organized processing hierarchy (see semantic networks). Support for their models came from a classic series of reaction-time experiments on human question answering.

=== Artificial intelligence ===
In artificial intelligence, Collins is recognized for work on intelligent tutoring systems and plausible reasoning. With collaborator Jaime Carbonell, Collins produced the first documented example of an intelligent tutor system called SCHOLAR CAI (computer-assisted instruction). Knowledge in SCHOLAR was structured analogously to the then theorized organization of human semantic memory as to afford a variety of meaningful interactions with the system. Collins's extensive research program pioneered discourse analysis methods to study the strategies human tutors use to adapt their teaching to learners. In addition, Collins studied and developed a formal theory characterizing the variety of plausible inferences people use to ask questions about which their knowledge is incomplete. Importantly, Collins developed methods to embed lessons learned from such research into the SCHOLAR system, improving system usability and effectiveness. Subsequently, Collins developed WHY, an intelligent tutoring system that used the Socratic method for tutoring causal knowledge and reasoning. In conjunction with this project he developed a formal computational theory of Socratic tutoring, derived from analyses of inquiry teaching dialogues.

=== Education ===
As a cognitive scientist and foundational member of the field of the learning sciences, Collins has influenced several strands of educational research and development. Building upon his work on intelligent tutoring systems, he has conducted numerous projects investigating the use of technology in schools and developing educational technologies for assessing and improving student learning. Collins has gradually shifted towards the situated cognition view of knowledge being embedded in the activity, context, and culture in which it is developed and used. In response to conventional practices that often ignore the influence of culture and activity, Collins and colleagues have developed and studied cognitive apprenticeship as an effective alternative educational practice. In addition, Collins was among the first to advocate for and outline design-based research methodologies in education.

== Death ==
Collins died on April 20, 2026, at the age of 88.

== Education and professional appointments ==
- B. A., University of Michigan, 1959 (Accounting)
- M. A., University of Michigan, 1961 (Communication Sciences)
- Ph. D., University of Michigan, 1970 (Cognitive Psychology)
- Senior Scientist, BBN Technologies, 1967–1982
- Principal Scientist, BBN Technologies, 1982–2000
- Professor, Education & Social Policy, Northwestern University, 1989–2005
- Co-director, U. S. Department of Education's Center for Technology in Education, 1991–1994
- Research Professor, School of Education, Boston College, 1998–2002
- Visiting Scholar, Harvard Graduate School of Education, 2001–2005
- Visiting Senior Lecturer, Harvard Graduate School of Education, 2005–2006
- Professor Emeritus, Education & Social Policy, Northwestern University, 2005–2026

== Academic honors and service ==
- National Academy of Education, Elected Member
- Association for the Advancement of Artificial Intelligence, Inaugural Fellow, 1990
- American Educational Research Association, Inaugural Fellow, 2008
- John Simon Guggenheim Memorial Foundation fellowship, 1974
- Sloan fellowship
- Founding chair of the Cognitive Science Society, 1979–1980
- Board member of the Cognitive Science Society, 1980–1987
- Founding editor, Cognitive Science, 1976–1980
- Editorial board, Cognitive Science, 1980–2000
- Editorial board, Discourse Processes, 1977–1987
- Editorial board, Cognition and Instruction, 1981–?
- Editorial board, Journal of the Learning Sciences, 1990–?

== Major publications ==
- Collins, A. M., & Quillian, M. R. (1969). Retrieval Time from Semantic Memory. Journal of Verbal Learning and Verbal Behavior, 8, 240–247. (citation classic)
- Collins, A. M., & Loftus, E. F. (1975). A Spreading Activation Theory of Semantic Processing. Psychological Review, 82, 407–428. (citation classic)
- Collins, A. M.; Michalski, R. S. (1989). "The logic of plausible reasoning: A core theory" (PDF). Cognitive Science. 13: 1–49. doi:10.1207/s15516709cog1301_1.
- Collins A. M., Brown J. S., & Newman S. (1989). Cognitive Apprenticeship: Teaching the Craft of Reading, Writing, and Mathematics, in Knowing, Learning and Instruction: Essays in Honor of Robert Glaser, edited by LB Resnick, Lawrence Erlbaum, Hillsdale, NJ.
- Brown, J. S.; Collins, A.M.; Duguid, P. (1989). "Situated cognition and the culture of learning" (PDF). Educational Researcher. 18 (1): 32–42. doi:10.3102/0013189x018001032. hdl:2142/17979. S2CID 9824073.
- Collins, A. M. (1992). Towards a design science of education. In E. Scanlon & T. O’Shea (Eds.), New directions in educational technology (pp. 15–22). Berlin: Springer.
- Collins, A. M.; Ferguson, W. (1993). "Epistemic forms and epistemic games: Structures and strategies to guide inquiry". Educational Psychologist. 28 (1): 25–42. doi:10.1207/s15326985ep2801_3.
- Greeno, J., Collins, A. M., & Resnick, L. (1996). Cognition and learning. (pp. 15–46) In D. Berliner and R. Calfee (Eds.), Handbook of Educational Psychology. New York: Macmillan.
- Bielaczyc, K. & Collins, A. M. (1999). Learning communities in classrooms: A reconceptualization of educational practice. In Reigeluth, C. M. (Ed), Instructional-design Theories and Models: A New Paradigm of Instructional Theory : 269–292.
- Collins, A.M.; Joseph, D.; Bielaczyc, K. (2004). "Design research: Theoretical and methodological issues" (PDF). Journal of the Learning Sciences. 13 (1): 15–42. doi:10.1207/s15327809jls1301_2. S2CID 7154229. Archived from the original (PDF) on 2010-06-13.
- Collins, A. & Halverson, R. (2009): Rethinking Education in the Age of Technology: The Digital Revolution and Schooling in America. New York: Teachers College Press.
