= Jay Cross =

American futurist (1944 – 2015)

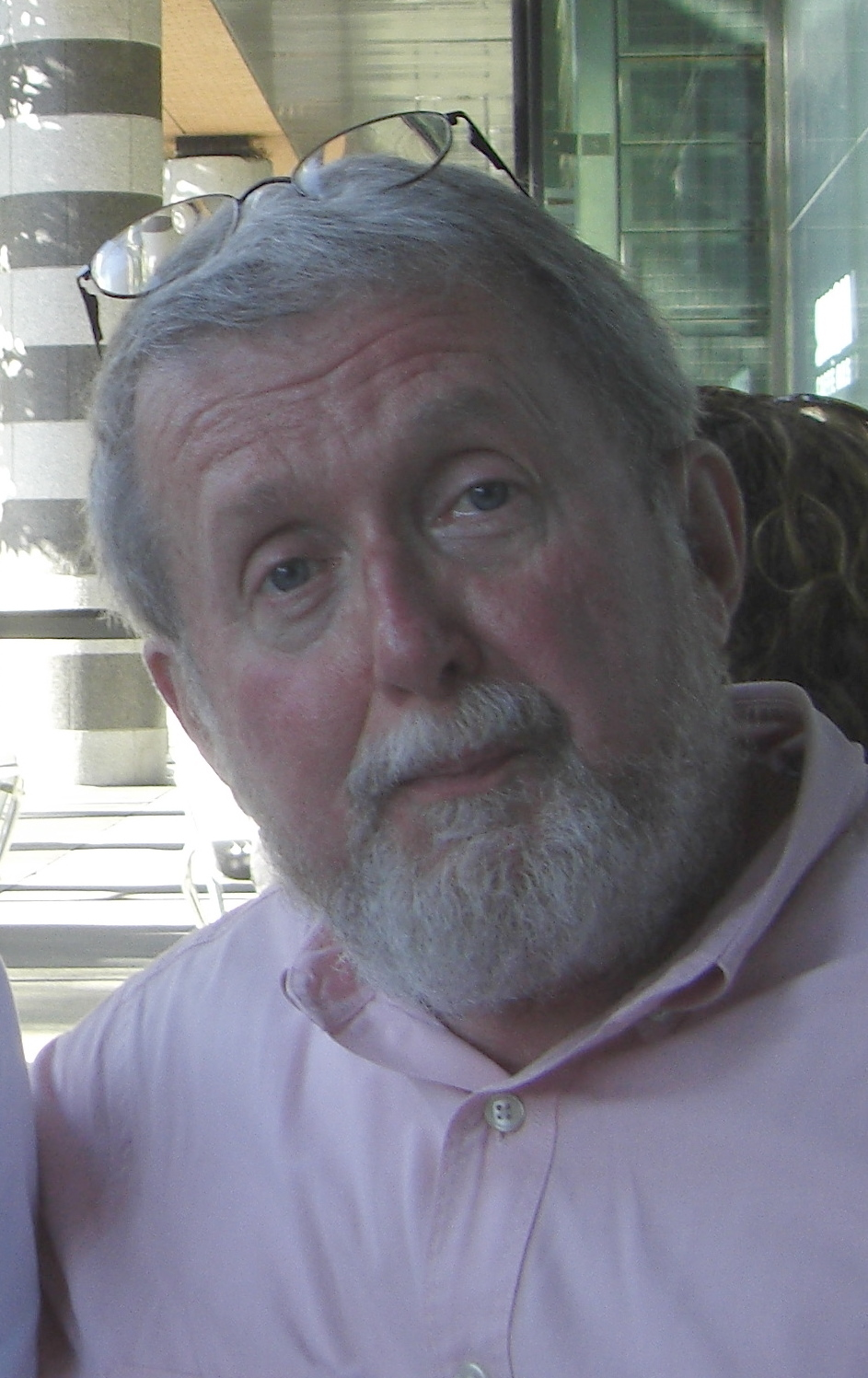
Jay Cross (2008)

James Calvin Cross Jr. (July 5, 1944 – November 6, 2015), was an American futurist who popularized the term "e-learning" and championed the cause of informal learning in business settings.

== Early life and schooling ==
Born in Hope, Arkansas, at Julia Chester Hospital to Lenora R. Cross and James Calvin Cross (who was the youngest member of the General Staff in U.S. Army history), he grew up in Virginia, Texas, Rhode Island, France, and Germany.

He attended the St. George's School in Newport, Rhode Island, and the Paris-American High School, a Department-of-Defense-run school in France. At Princeton he belonged to the Charter Club and received an AB in sociology (1966).

He served in the U.S. Army from 1968 to 1970, stationed primarily in Germany. In May 1970, the month of his discharge, he married Uta Bawey in Heidelberg. Cross returned to the U.S., attending Harvard Business School, receiving an MBA in 1974.

== Career ==
1966–1968, NCR selling mainframe computers.

1976–1978, John Sperling hired Cross for an education startup created out of Sperling's professorship at San Jose State University. Cross wrote a business course for Sperling, then a business degree program for what eventually became the University of Phoenix.

Cross wrote in his eulogy of Sperling, "John told me he wanted our graduates to be able to talk like business people. It was a Turing test. Can you tell the accomplished business person from the recent winner of an accelerated degree?...While still in the midst of development, I hired and managed the sales force to sell it. Commission only. John was adamant that we were a profit-making business venture and needed to pay our bills as they came due."

1978–1998, Omega Performance corporation, converting the organization from startup into an Inc 500 winner that trained a million banking professionals to make sound decisions and sell services.

In 1998 Cross founded Internet Time Group to help the people in organizations learn. He joined several colleagues (Jane Hart, Harold Jarche, Charles Jennings, and Clark Quinn) to form the Internet Time Alliance in 2008, which persists as a legacy.

In 1998, frustrated with attention being placed on e-commerce for training, Cross said to a colleague, "People just don't see it although it's right in front of them. The next big thing in education isn't e-commerce, it's eeeeee-learning." He began writing online about "e-learning" that year. Because there are others who are said to have coined the term e-learning, Cross described his involvement by saying, "the term grew around him." There are claims he coined the term as late as 2004.

From 1999 to 2001, he worked closely with TPT Systems, which became CBT Systems, then SmartForce, then Skillsoft.

In 2001, with colleagues Claudia Welss, Claudia L'Amoreaux, and Clark Quinn, Cross created the Meta-Learning Lab, which believed that everyone has the capacity to learn but most people can do a much better job of it. Learning is a skill one can improve. Learning how to learn is a key to its mastery.

From 2001 to 2003 Cross was CEO of Emergent Learning Forum (which began as the eLearning Forum), an 1,800-member society, think tank and advocacy group. For five years, this non-commercial community of people made decisions at the intersection of learning, technology, business, and design and participated in a global conversation of vital eLearning issues.

Cross wrote his first significant paper on informal learning in 2003 (updated 2009).

He first heard the phrase informal learning from the late Peter Henschel, the then director of the Institute for Research on Learning (IRL), who said to Cross, "People are learning all the time, in varied settings and often most effectively in the context of work itself. Training – formal learning of all kinds – channels some important learning but doesn't carry the heaviest load. The workhorse of the knowledge economy has been, and continues to be, informal learning." Cross later abandoned the term informal learning in favor of "working smarter," though he could never really step away from the original term because his book remains popular in the field.

For a time Cross was managing director of Workflow Institute, which promoted the understanding of real-time enterprise-level learning in industry and government.

He spoke often at events and conferences across the globe, including Europe, India, the Middle East, Australia, and more. The Oxford Debate on Informal in 2011 pitted several elearning leaders against one another to talk about its merits and drawbacks.

Other events included Emergent Learning Forum, Online Learning, Training, Image World, Instructional Systems Association, ASTD International, eLearn International, Edge-X, Training Directors Forum, I-KNOW, Bank Marketing Association, and many other venues. He delivered the inaugural keynote on web marketing to the first meeting of the Online Banking Association.

Cross became part of the steering committee for Online Educa, and had a lasting impact on the creation of the business stream with colleagues Laura Overton and Charles Jennings. He attended and spoke at almost every meeting during his lifetime.

In March 2016, at their Learning Solutions conference, the eLearning Guild posthumously recognized Cross as a Guild Master, in honor of his contributions to the field.

=== Publications ===
He was also a prolific and published author. In addition to his widely read blogs, he was a columnist for Chief Learning Officer magazine and guest contributor to Learning in the New Economy magazine.

Books authored:

- Real Learning (2015)
- Working Smarter Fieldbook (2010)
- Informal Learning (2006)
- Implementing E-Learning (2002)

Books contributed to:

- "Changing Worlds of Learning: Strengthening Informal Learning in Formal Institutions?" in Changing Cultures in Higher Education: Moving Ahead to Future Learning. Ulf-Daniel Ehlers, Dirk Schneckenberg (editors). Springer. March 2010.
- "Learning Informally in Your Workscape," in the ASTD Handbook, 2nd Edition. Elaine Biech (editor). ASTD Press. May 4, 2014.
- "The SUNTan Story: Sun Microsystems," in Implementing E-Learning Solutions Christina Pope (editor). ASTD Press. January 2006.
- Foreword to The Handbook of Blended Learning: Global Perspectives, Local Designs Curtis J. Bonk, Charles R. Graham (editors). Pfeiffer. December 2005.

His interests also included design, photography, conceptual art, hiking, and the nature of time, technology. He was director and webmaster of the Berkeley Path Wanderers Association. In 2011 he began writing about the Berkeley Diet, focused on food-related news and featuring restaurants in the Berkeley California area.

Called by many "the Johnny Appleseed of informal learning," Cross was recognized for challenging assumptions, and challenged the entire corporate education field to see beyond the present to imagine what the future of learning could be. He was an advocate of using common sense to approach learning. He experimented, failed fast and often, and was always improving. He fought against pedagogy for pedagogy sake, explored the edges, and was always learning something new. He was constantly thinking about what was new on the horizon. His legacy lives on through the countless people he has inspired with his work.

== Death ==
Cross died at his home in the hills of Berkeley, California on November 6, 2015. He left behind wife Uta [Bawey] Cross and sons James Cross III and Austin Cross.
