= Naomi Miyake =

Japanese cognitive psychologist (1948–2015)

- Born: June 8, 1948
- Died: May 15, 2015 (aged 66)
- Occupation: Professor
- Known for: Research on collaborative learning

Academic background
- Education: University of California, San Diego
- Thesis: Constructive interaction and the iterative process of understanding
- Doctoral advisor: Donald Norman

Academic work
- Discipline: Cognitive science
- Institutions: Chukyo University, University of Tokyo

Naomi Miyake (三宅 なほみ, Miyake Nahomi; June 8, 1948 – May 29, 2015) was a Japanese cognitive psychologist. She was a professor at Chukyo University and the University of Tokyo. She is best known for her research on learning and collaboration, in the field of cognitive science.

== Biography ==
Miyake was born and raised in Japan. She completed a master's degree at the University of Tokyo in 1974. She earned a PhD in psychology from the University of California, San Diego, in 1982, supervised by Donald Norman.

After completing her PhD, Miyake returned to Japan and obtained a position at Aoyama Gakuin Women's Junior College, where she stayed for seven years. From 1991 to 2009, she was a professor in the School of Computer and Cognitive Science at Chukyo University in Nagoya. In 2009, she joined the University of Tokyo, where she was a professor in the Graduate School of Education, as well as the Deputy Director of the Consortium for Renovating Education of the Future.

Miyake was a founding member of the International Society of the Learning Sciences, and served a term as its president. She also served as president of the Japanese Cognitive Science Society and of the International Association for Cognitive Science. She was a board member of the American Cognitive Science Society.

Miyake was married to Yoshio Miyake, a fellow cognitive psychologist. They had a son, Masaki.

Miyake died in 2015 of cancer. In a posthumous tribute, psychologist Allan M. Collins credited Miyake as a "leading thinker" in the field of cognitive science, and acknowledged her role in establishing the field internationally. Cognitive scientist Marcia Linn noted Miyake's role as a pioneer amongst women in academia in Japan, observing that she became a professor in departments where women were a rarity.

== Research ==
Miyake's dissertation was titled "Constructive interaction and the iterative process of understanding". In this work, she examined interactions between pairs of subjects who had been asked to complete a learning task together (exploring how a sewing machine worked). She coined the phrase “constructive interaction” for the ways in which the partners worked together to reach a deeper understanding of the problem. She published an article based on her dissertation research in the journal Cognitive Science.

She continued to study collaborative learning throughout her research career, examining subjects across the lifespan (from early childhood to adulthood) and combining interests in education, psychology, and engineering.

In her later work, Miyake experimented with the use of robots as learning partners for young students. She is credited with being the first researcher to investigate how best to design robots that can enhance children's learning.

== Selected works ==
- Miyake, Naomi; Norman, Donald A. (1979). "To ask a question, one must know enough to know what is not known". Journal of Verbal Learning and Verbal Behavior. 18 (3): 357–364. doi:10.1016/S0022-5371(79)90200-7. S2CID 141035423.
- Miyake, N. (1986). "Constructive interaction and the iterative process of understanding". Cognitive Science. 10 (2): 151–177. doi:10.1016/S0364-0213(86)80002-7.
- Hatano, Giyoo; Miyake, Naomi (1991). "What does a cultural approach offer to research on learning?". Learning and Instruction. 1 (3): 273–281. doi:10.1016/0959-4752(91)90008-V.
- Shirouzu, Hajime; Miyake, Naomi; Masukawa, Hiroyuki (2002). "Cognitively active externalization for situated reflection". Cognitive Science. 26 (4): 469–501. doi:10.1207/s15516709cog2604_3.
- Davis, Elizabeth A.; Miyake, Naomi (2004). "Explorations of Scaffolding in Complex Classroom Systems". Journal of the Learning Sciences. 13 (3): 265–272. doi:10.1207/s15327809jls1303_1. S2CID 62193862.
