= Richard Lesh =

Richard A. Lesh
- Education: Indiana University Bloomington; Hanover College
- Scientific career
- Fields: Learning sciences; Cognitive science; Mathematics education
- Workplaces: Indiana University Bloomington; Northwestern University
- Thesis: The Generalization of Piagetian Operations as It Relates to the Hypothesized Functional Interdependence Between Class, Series and Number Concepts (1971)
- Doctoral advisor: John F. LeBlanc
- Doctoral students: Tamara J. Moore

Richard Arthur Lesh Jr. is a professor of learning sciences, cognitive science, and mathematics education at Indiana University Bloomington. He retired from Indiana University in 2012. He graduated from Indiana University Bloomington in 1971 with a Ph.D. in mathematics, cognitive psychology, and statistics for research in the social sciences. He is also a graduate of Hanover College, where he received a B.A. in mathematics and physics.

Lesh is the originator of the Models and Modeling Perspectives research area of Mathematics education and the creator of the model-eliciting activity, which is designed to help reveal thinking processes to students, teachers, and researchers. In his work life, Lesh has worked at a variety of career positions, including as a National Science Foundation official, dean and professor at Northwestern University, principal research scientist at Educational Testing Services, and endowed professor at both Purdue University and Indiana University, where he tried to develop various alternative assessment techniques that could be used to detect learning which traditional assessment strategies did not.

== See also ==
- Systemics
- Design-Based Research
