= Laboratory for Interactive Learning Technologies =

Research group in the University of Hawaii at Manoa

The Laboratory for Interactive Learning Technologies (LILT), a research group in the Department of Information and Computer Sciences (ICS) of the University of Hawaii at Manoa, pursues a diverse portfolio of cognitive science, human-computer interaction, and social sciences approaches to technology-supported learning, collaboration and online communities. Currently LILT has a strong focus on studying how technology affordances support social processes of learning, ranging from the meaning-making dialogues of small groups to supporting reflective practice in online communities. LILT members are also pursuing new directions in wireless and mobile technologies for education.

The Collaborative Representations project, led by LILT director Dr. Daniel Suthers examines how participants appropriate and are influenced by the affordances of collaborative learning software, and develops strategies for embedding such technologies in educational practice. Dr. Violet Harada and Dr. Suthers co-direct Hawaii Networked Learning Communities (HNLC), studying the use of online community software in support of educators distributed throughout the islands. The software is also being applied to university teaching, with the assistance of Dr. Samuel Joseph and several students. Dr. Joseph leads projects related to wireless and mobile technologies in learning, including second language vocabulary learning and next generation wireless applications. LILT also supports education and outreach efforts related to the marine ecosystems of Hawaii.

Situated halfway between North America and Asia, LILT maintains relationships with both geographic communities of researchers. For example, Dr. Suthers serves on committees of the Asia-Pacific Society for Computers in Education (APSCE) and the International Society of the Learning Sciences (ISLS). He is executive associate editor of the APSCE journal Research and Practice in Technology Enhanced Learning and associate editor of the ISLS International Journal of Computer Supported Collaborative Learning. Dr. Samuel Joseph is a former resident of Japan and continues to collaborate with Japanese companies. Ravi Vatrapu's research explores the influence of culture on the interpretation and use of social affordances of online learning environments.
