= Learning sciences =

Study of how people learn

Learning sciences (LS) is the interdisciplinary, scientific study of human learning and its processes in the real world. It explores how people learn, identifies what might be important for human learning, engages in the design and implementation of learning environments, and improves instructional methodologies.

Drawing on cognitive psychology, neuroscience, education, computer science and sociology, LS researchers study the interactions among learners, social groups, technologies, and environments.

Major contributing fields include cognitive science, educational psychology, affective science, computer science, neuroscience, anthropology, and linguistics.

Over the past decade, LS researchers have expanded their focus to include informal learning environments, instructional methods, policy innovations, and the design of curricula.

== Domain definition ==
As an interdisciplinary field, LS draws from many traditions and perspectives, thus its identity is multifaceted and varies between institutions. However, the International Society of the Learning Sciences (ISLS) summarizes the field as follows: "Researchers in the interdisciplinary field of learning sciences, born during the 1990s, study learning as it happens in real-world situations and how to better facilitate learning in designed environments – in school, online, in the workplace, at home, and in informal environments. Learning sciences research may be guided by constructivist, social-constructivist, socio-cognitive, and socio-cultural theories of learning."

ISLS has a large worldwide membership, is affiliated with two international journals: Journal of the Learning Sciences and International Journal of Computer Supported Collaborative Learning, and has previously sponsored the biennial Computer Supported Collaborative Learning conference and International Conference of the Learning Sciences on alternate years. Since 2020, these two conferences have been combined as a unified ISLS Annual Meeting with one track for each conference.

Although controlled experimental studies and rigorous qualitative research have long been employed in learning sciences, LS researchers often use design-based research methods. Interventions are conceptualized and implemented in natural settings to test the ecological validity of dominant theory, as well as to develop new theories and frameworks for conceptualizing learning, instruction, design processes, and educational reform. LS research strives to generate principles of practice beyond the particular features of an educational innovation to solve real educational problems in the real world, giving LS its interventionist character.

== History ==
Several significant events contributed to the international development of learning sciences. The earliest history can be traced back to the cognitive revolution.

In 1983 in the United States, Jan Hawkins and Roy Pea proposed a collaboration between Bank Street College and The New School for Social Research to create a graduate program in learning sciences. The program, known as "Psychology, Education, and Technology" (PET), was supported through a planning grant from the Alfred P. Sloan Foundation. However, the program was never established due to the requirement of hiring new faculty.

In 1988, Roger Schank's arrival at Northwestern University contributed to the development of the Institute for Learning Sciences. In 1991, Northwestern initiated the first LS doctoral program, designed and launched by Pea as its first director. The program accepted their first student cohort in 1992. Following Pea's new position as dean, Brian Reiser assumed the role of program directorship. Since then, many LS graduate programs have appeared globally, and the field continues to gain recognition as an innovative and influential field for education research and design.

The Journal of the Learning Sciences was first published in 1991, with Janet Kolodner as founding editor. Yasmin Kafai and Cindy Hmelo-Silver took over as editors in 2009, followed by Iris Tabak and Joshua Radinsky in 2013. The International Journal of Computer-Supported Collaborative Learning was established as a separate journal in 2006, edited by Gerry Stahl and Friederich Hesse. Although these journals were relatively new within education research, they rapidly escalated into the upper ranks of the Educational Research section of the Social Sciences Citation Index impact factor rankings.

In August 1991, the Institute for the Learning Sciences hosted its first International Conference for the Learning Sciences (ICLS) at Northwestern University (edited by Lawrence Birnbaum and published by the AACE, but no longer available). In 1994, ICLS hosted the first biennial meeting, which also took place at Northwestern. The International Society of the Learning Sciences (ISLS) was later established in 2002 by Janet Kolodner, Tim Koschmann, and Chris Hoadley. Since 2021, both ICLS and the International Conference on Computer-Supported Collaborative Learning (CSCL) have been held yearly as part of the ISLS Annual Meeting.

== Distinguishing characteristics ==
By integrating multiple fields, learning sciences extends beyond other closely related fields. For example, learning sciences extends beyond psychology, in that it accounts for and contributes to computational, sociological and anthropological approaches to the study of learning. Similarly, LS draws inspiration from cognitive science, and is regarded as a branch of cognitive science; however, it gives particular attention to improving education through the study, modification, and creation of new technologies and learning environments, and various interacting and emergent factors that potentially influence human learning.

Many LS researchers employ design-based research methodology. The growing acceptance of design-based research methodology as a means for study is often viewed as a significant distinction of LS from the many fields that contribute to it. By including design-based research within its methodological toolkit, learning sciences qualifies as a "design science", sharing common characteristics with other design sciences that employ design science methodology such as engineering and computer science. Learning sciences is also considered by some as having some degree of overlap with instructional design, although the two communities developed in different ways, at times emphasizing different programs of research. These differences are described in greater detail in a 2004 special issue of Educational Technology.

Design-based research is by no means the only research methodology used in the field. Additional methodologies include computational modeling, experimental and quasi-experimental research, and non-interventionist ethnographic-style qualitative research methodologies.

== See also ==
- Artificial intelligence – Intelligence in machines
- Cognitive psychology – Subdiscipline of psychology
- Cognitive science – Interdisciplinary scientific study of cognitive processes
- Computer-supported collaborative learning – Pedagogical approach
- Education sciences
- Educational psychology – Branch of psychology concerned with the scientific study of human learning
- Educational technology – Use of technology in education to enhance learning and teaching
- Evidence-based education – Paradigm of the education field
- Malleability of intelligence – Processes by which intelligence can change over time
- Pedagogy
