= OEB =

OEB may refer to:

== Publications ==
- The Official Encyclopedia of Bridge
- Online Egyptological Bibliography
- Open English Bible, a Bible translation
- Operation Engineering Bulletin, a type of Aircraft flight manual

== Science and technology ==
- Oil Equivalent Barrel, unit of energy released by burning one barrel of crude oil
- Online Educa Berlin, an annual conference on technology-supported learning
- Open eBook, an e-book format

== Other uses ==
- Octavia E. Butler, an American science-fiction author
- Ontario Energy Board, which regulates natural gas and electricity utilities in Ontario
- Oregon Educational Broadcasting, a public television station
- Branch County Memorial Airport's FAA location identifier
