= Yasmin Kafai =

Yasmin B. Kafai
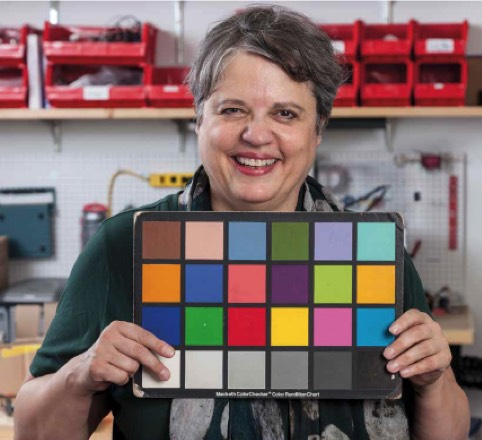
- Education: Harvard University; Technische Universität Berlin
- Known for: Constructionism; Scratch; Electronic textiles
- Scientific career
- Fields: Learning sciences Computer science Constructionist learning Game studies
- Workplaces: University of Pennsylvania; University of California Los Angeles; Massachusetts Institute of Technology
- Academic advisors: Seymour Papert; Idit Harel

Yasmin B. Kafai is a German-American academic who is a Professor of Learning Sciences at the University of Pennsylvania Graduate School of Education, with a secondary appointment in Computer and Information Sciences at the University of Pennsylvania School of Engineering and Applied Science. Kafai is recognized for her contributions to studying the role of children and teens as designers of computing systems (e.g., games, tangible interfaces, and machine learning models) and how such design activities support young people's learning and development.

She is a past president of the International Society of the Learning Sciences (ISLS), and an executive editor of the Journal of the Learning Sciences. Yasmin is an inaugural fellow of the International Society of the Learning Sciences and a fellow of the American Educational Research Association. She received the 2025 Association for Computing Machinery Karl V. Karlstrom Outstanding Educator Award, with Mitchel Resnick, for their "contributions to creative computing, including Scratch and electronic textiles, developing new ways for young people to create and collaborate within learning communities."

== Life ==
Kafai was born in Germany and has worked and studied in Germany, France, and the United States. In the U.S., she worked with Seymour Papert at the MIT Media Laboratory and was a faculty member of the UCLA Graduate School of Education and Information Studies.

Kafai is a pioneer in research on computing, gaming, and learning. Utilizing constructionist theory, she examines technology designs and culture, and helped to set the foundation for programmatic initiatives on games and learning. Kafai was an early developer and researcher of Scratch, an educational programming language that allows young people to creatively participate as programmers in the development of computing projects. She is also an active voice on the involvement of girls in gaming and programming and on the impact of virtual gaming on real-life social behavior in youth.

Kafai is an editor of Beyond Barbie and Mortal Kombat: New Perspectives on Gender and Gaming (2008), a collection of essays that builds on the groundbreaking book From Barbie to Mortal Kombat (Cassell and Jenkins, 2000). Beyond Barbie and Mortal Kombat presents new developments in gaming, gender, and learning, and why gender-based stereotypes persist in gaming. Kafai's 1995 book Minds in Play: Computer Design as a Context for Children's Learning helped to establish the field of gaming and learning. She also wrote Under the Microscope: A Decade of Gender Equity Interventions in the Sciences (2004), contributed to Tech-Savvy: Educating Girls in the New Computer Age, and has written several journal and book articles.

== Published books ==
- Kafai, Y. B. & Burke, Q. (2016). Connected gaming: What making video games can teach us about learning and literacy. Cambridge, MA: The MIT Press.
- Kafai, Y. B. & Burke, Q. (2014). Connected code: Why children need to learn programming. Cambridge, MA: The MIT Press.
- Kafai, Y. B. & Fields, D. A. (2013). Connected play: Tweens in a virtual world. Cambridge, MA: The MIT Press.
- Kafai, Y. B. (1995). Minds in Play: Computer Game Design as a Context for Children's Learning. Mahwah, NJ: Lawrence Erlbaum.

== Edited books ==
- Holbert, N., Berland, M., & Kafai, Y. B. (Eds.). (2020). Designing constructionist futures: The art, theory, and practice of learning designs. MIT Press.
- Buechley, L., Peppler, K. A., Eisenberg, M., & Kafai, Y. B. (Eds.) (2013). Textile messages: Dispatches from the world of electronic textiles and education. New York: Peter Lang Publishers.
- Kafai, Y. B., Peppler, K. A., & Chapman, R. N. (Eds.) (2009). The computer clubhouse: Constructionism and creativity in youth communities. New York: Teachers College Press.
- Kafai, Y. B., Heeter, C., Denner, J., & Sun, J. (Eds.) (2008). Beyond Barbie and Mortal Kombat: New perspectives on gender and gaming. Cambridge, MA: The MIT Press.
- Kafai, Y. B., & Resnick, M. (Eds.) (1996). Constructionism in practice: Designing, thinking, and learning in a digital world. Mahwah, NJ: Lawrence Erlbaum.
