= Elizabeth Davis (science educator) =

American science educator

Elizabeth Anna "Betsy" Davis is a scholar of science education and a professor in the University of Michigan School of Education. Her focus is on the education of science teachers at the elementary school and middle school level, and on the materials available to help them educate students.

== Education and career ==
Davis majored in engineering at Princeton University, graduating in 1989 with a bachelor's degree in engineering and management systems. She received a master's degree in 1994 in mathematics and science education from the University of California, Berkeley, and continued at Berkeley for a Ph.D. in 1998. Her dissertation, Scaffolding Students' Reflection for Science Learning, was supervised by Marcia Linn.

She became an assistant professor in the University of Michigan School of Education in 1998. She was promoted to associate professor in 2006, chaired the elementary education program from 2010 to 2014, and was promoted to full professor in 2015.

== Recognition ==
Davis received the Presidential Early Career Award for Scientists and Engineers in 2002. She was named as a Fellow of the American Educational Research Association in 2024.
