= Design science =

Systematic and rational approach to designing

Design science refers to a scientific, i.e. rational and systematic, approach to designing. An early concept of design science was introduced in 1957 by R. Buckminster Fuller who defined it as a systematic form of designing which he applied especially in innovative engineering design. The concept has been more broadly defined by the Design Science journal as “quantitative and qualitative research in the creation of artifacts and systems, and their embedding in our physical, virtual, psychological, economic, and social environment”.

== Design-science relationship ==
There has been recurrent concern to differentiate design from science. Nigel Cross differentiated between scientific design, design science and a science of design. A science of design (the scientific study of design) does not require or assume that the acts of designing are themselves scientific, and an increasing number of research programs take this view. To some extent the two uses of the term design science (systematic designing and the study of designing) have co-mingled to the point where there can be some confusion, and design science sometimes may be referred to either as meaning a science of design or design as a science.

== A science of design ==
Herbert A. Simon's The Sciences of the Artificial, first published in 1969, built on previous developments and motivated the further development of systematic and formalized design methodologies relevant to many design disciplines, for example architecture, engineering, urban planning, computer science, and management studies. Simon's ideas about the science of design also encouraged the development of design research and the scientific study of designing.

== Design as a science ==
The design-science relationship continues to be debated and there continue to be many efforts to reframe or reform design as science. For example, the axiomatic theory of design by Suh presents a domain independent theory that can explain or prescribe the design process. The Function-Behavior-Structure (FBS) ontology by Gero, presenting a domain independent ontology of design and designing, is another example. There have also been many domain-specific developments of design science, for example in architectural design, product design and information systems design.

=== Design science in information systems ===
There has been a particular emphasis on design as a science within information systems. Hevner and Chatterjee provide a reference on design science research (DSR) in Information Systems, including a selection of papers from the DESRIST conferences, a look at key principles of DSR, and the integration of action research with design research. Hevner et al. provide a set of seven guidelines which help information systems researchers conduct, evaluate and present design-science research. The seven guidelines address design as an artifact, problem relevance, design evaluation, research contributions, research rigor, design as a search process, and research communication. Later extensions of the design science research approach detail how design and research problems can be decomposed rationally by means of nested problem solving.

In 2010, 122 German professors promoted design science in information system research by signing a memorandum subsequently submitted in English to the European Journal of Information Systems. In the same issue the then Editor-in-Chief of the European Journal of Information Systems (EJIS) Rickard Baskerville, along with the then Editor-in-Chief of the Information Systems Research (ISR) Vallabh Sambamurthy, with the then Editor-in-Chief of Management Information Systems Quarterly (MISQ) Detmar Straub, and the former Editor-in-Chief of the Journal of the Association for Information Systems (JAIS) Kalle Lyytinen together authored a rebuttal to some of the claims made in the memorandum regarding bias against DSR.

== See also ==
- Citizen Design Science
- Descriptive science § Descriptive versus design sciences
- Design methods
- Design research
- Design science research
- Design thinking
