= Gerry Stahl =

American computer scientist

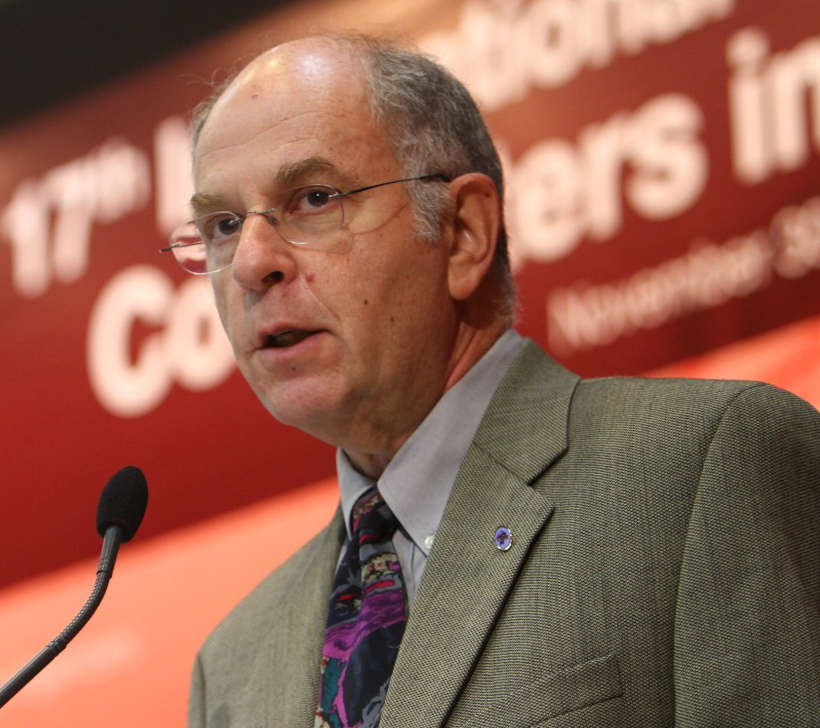
- Gerry Stahl keynote at ICCE 2009 in Hong Kong
- Born: March 16, 1945 (age 81); Wilmington, Delaware, U.S.
- Education: Massachusetts Institute of Technology; Northwestern University; University of Colorado Boulder
- Scientific career
- Fields: Computer-supported collaborative learning
- Workplaces: Drexel University
- Academic advisors: Theodore Kisiel
- Website: gerrystahl.net

Gerry Stahl (born 1945) is an American computer scientist specializing in computer-supported collaborative learning. He is professor emeritus of computing and informatics at Drexel University, and was the founding editor-in-chief of the International Journal of Computer-Supported Collaborative Learning.

== Education and career ==
Stahl studied philosophy and mathematics at the Massachusetts Institute of Technology, graduating in 1967. While supporting himself with work as a systems programmer, he completed a Ph.D. in philosophy at Northwestern University in 1975, with a dissertation on the philosophy of Heidegger and Marx. After returning to graduate study at the University of Colorado Boulder, he completed a second Ph.D. in computer science there in 1993.

After working for several years as a researcher at the university and various software firms, he became an associate professor at Drexel University in 2002. He was given tenure there in 2008, and promoted to full professor in 2012. He retired as professor emeritus in 2014.

He is the founding editor-in-chief of the International Journal of Computer-Supported Collaborative Learning, an official journal of the International Society of the Learning Sciences, which published its first issue in 2006. He stepped down as editor-in-chief in 2016.

== Books ==
Stahl is the author of books including:

- Group Cognition: Computer Support for Building Collaborative Knowledge (MIT Press, 2006)
- Studying Virtual Math Teams (Springer, 2009)
- Translating Euclid: Designing a Human-Centered Mathematics (Morgan & Claypool, 2013)
- Constructing Dynamic Triangles Together: The Development of Mathematical Group Cognition (Cambridge University Press, 2016)
- Theoretical Investigations: Philosophical Foundations of Group Cognition (Springer, 2021)
