= Govert Schüller =

Dutch-American author (born 1959)

Govert Schüller (born 1959) is a Dutch-American author who writes about Jiddu Krishnamurti and theosophy. He studied philosophy at the University of Leiden and the University of Amsterdam. He has also studied under the Heidegger scholar Theodore Kisiel at Northern Illinois University. He has received a Master of Research degree from University of Wales Trinity Saint David.

Schüller's study of Krishnamurti has been called "perhaps the most comprehensive assessment of Krishnamurti from the theosophical point of view." Schüller maintains Alpheus.org, a website "dedicated to esoteric and other alternative interpretations of history", shifting its direction, according to an announcement in October 2013, "towards a more philosophical, skeptical and scientific view".

== Works ==
- "Krishnamurti and the World Teacher Project: Some Theosophical Perceptions" Theosophical History: Occasional Papers 5. (Fullerton, California: Theosophical History Foundation). ISSN 1068-2597
- "The Masters and Their Emissaries: From H.P.B. to Guru Ma and Beyond" (2nd ed.). (1999). Alpheus. Carol Stream, Illinois: Govert W. Schuller. Retrieved 2010-10-22.
- "Krishnamurti". alpheus.org. Govert W. Schuller. 2001. Retrieved 2011-04-16.
- Theosophy and Krishnamurti : Harmonies and Tensions Theosophical Society in America. Audiobook on CD, Theosophical Society in America, 2004
- "Jean Overton Fuller, Master Narayan, and the Krishnamurti-Scott-Anrias Issue", Theosophical History ed. James Santucci XIV/1-2 (January–April 2008) California State University, Fullerton, CA
- "The State of the TS (Adyar) in 2008: A Psycho-esoteric Interpretation (draft)". 2008. Alpheus. Carol Stream, Illinois: Govert W. Schuller. Retrieved 2010-10-13
