= William Clancey =

American computer scientist

William J. Clancey (born 1952) is an American computer scientist who specializes in cognitive science and artificial intelligence. He has worked in computing in a wide range of sectors, including medicine, education, and finance, and had performed research that brings together cognitive and social science to study work practices and examine the design of agent systems. Clancey has been described as having developed “some of the earliest artificial intelligence programs for explanation, the critiquing method of consultation, tutorial discourse, and student modeling,” and his research has been described as including “work practice modeling, distributed multiagent systems, and the ethnography of field science.” He has also participated in Mars Exploration Rover mission operations, “simulation of a day-in-the-life of the ISS, knowledge management for future launch vehicles, and developing flight systems that make automation more transparent.” Clancey’s work on "heuristic classification" and "model construction operators" is regarded as having been influential in the design of expert systems and instructional programs.

Clancey was chief scientist for Human-Centered Computing at NASA Ames Research Center, Intelligent Systems Division from 1998-2013, where he managed the Work Systems Design & Evaluation Group. During this intergovernmental personnel assignment as a civil servant, he was also employed at the Florida Institute for Human and Machine Cognition in Pensacola, where he holds the title of senior research scientist.

== Early life and education ==
William J. Clancey was born and grew up in New Jersey. He was a Boy Scout and rose to the rank of Eagle Scout.

In an eighth-grade commencement address entitled “Humanity's Next Great Adventure,” given at a school in San Mateo, California, in 2002, Clancey recalled his own school years, when he “always got extra credit in eighth grade science, answering quiz questions about the latest Gemini two-person launches, getting us ready for the first trip to the moon in three years. I used to read these stories in the New York Times--absorbing every word. And of course when Star Trek began on TV in September, I watched the first episode and haven't missed any in 36 years. So space travel was on my mind as I sat at MY eighth grade graduation, and it's probably no coincidence that I work for NASA today.”

He graduating as valedictorian from East Brunswick High School, earning honors in biology. He majored in Mathematical Sciences at Rice University in Houston, where in connection with his interest in cognition he took courses in a range of fields, including philosophy, anthropology, linguistics, religion, and sociology. He has said that at Rice “I went through the catalog and took every course that mentioned 'knowledge' or 'cognition,' regardless of the department.” He would later write that “The courses that had the greatest influence on my later work were 'The philosophy of knowledge' (Konstantin Kolenda), 'Language, thought, and culture' (Stephen Tyler), and 'The radical sociology of knowledge' (Kenneth Leiter). My advisor was Ken Kennedy, who taught a fantastic course on compilers. Altogether, I took 40 courses in 13 departments, including six anthropology and three philosophy courses. Rice's teachers were wonderful lecturers who inspired you with their own enthusiasm and the clarity of their thought.” He was elected to Phi Beta Kappa and received a B.A. summa cum laude in 1974.

He then went to Stanford University, where he was engaged in expert systems research.[1] He received a Ph.D. in computer science from that institution in 1979, specifically in the area of Artificial Intelligence, He has said that at Stanford, “I focused on Artificial Intelligence, but again combined different areas by developing a computer program to teach medical students how to diagnose a patient (combining computer science, education, psychology, and medicine).” His dissertation project, he has said, “was the first attempt to use an expert system for instruction.” He describes himself as having been “a member of the 'Mycin Gang' in the Heuristic Programming Project, which became the Knowledge Systems Laboratory in the late 1970s. These projects were directed by Bruce G. Buchanan.”

== Career ==
=== Before NASA ===
From 1979 to 1987, according to Clancey, he “managed research on Neomycin (one of the first second-generation expert systems) and a variety of associated explanation, instructional, and learning programs funded by the Office of Naval Research and the McDonnell Foundation.” He also designed “the instructional program GUIDON for teaching medical diagnostic strategy.” In his own words, he “developed some of the earliest AI programs for explanation, the critiquing method of consultation, tutorial discourse, and student modeling. My work on 'heuristic classification' and 'model construction operators' has been influential in the design of expert systems and instructional programs.”

From 1988 to 1997 Clancey was associated with the Institute for Research on Learning in Menlo Park, California,[1] of which he was a founding member. It was there that “he co-developed the methods of business anthropology in corporate environments.” His “special interest” at that institute, he has said, was “in relating the cognitive and social perspectives about knowledge and learning. I worked on organizational change and work systems design projects in corporate settings at the former Nynex Science and Technology, Xerox (Customer Care Center, Dallas), and Kaiser-Permanente (Pasadena, CA).”

Clancey has explained this work more simply as follows: “I worked with social scientists (anthropologists, sociologists, and educational psychologists)....We observed people in businesses (such as a customer call center) to understand how learning naturally occurs. We emphasized how people succeed in doing their work despite having inadequate tools or incomplete procedures, by studying how they helped and learned from each other.” He has also said that his “broad college background in computer science, philosophy, and anthropology...helped me understand the social scientists at the Institute for Research on Learning, so I could relate what I knew about computer science to what they knew about people.”

Clancey co-founded Teknowledge, which describes itself as an “IT solutions & ITES company with specialization in Finance Domain, Stocks, Forex, Supply-Chain Management, Enterprise (BOT) Build Operate and Transfer Model & Mobile Development.” He was also a founder of Modernsoft, which produces Financial Genome, “a unique business modeling software for Excel.” He was a founding Editor-in-Chief of AAAI/MIT Press, established by the Association for the Advancement of Artificial Intelligence and The MIT Press in 1989 “as a publishing imprint founded to serve the information needs of the international AI community,” and he has also been a Senior Editor of Cognitive Science.

=== NASA ===
Clancey was at NASA from 1998 until 2013. Among his research at NASA has been the use of “work practice simulation to design and evaluate varying configurations of roles and responsibilities for people and automated systems in safety-critical situations.”

In a 2000 presentation, Clancey explained how an awareness of the different types of cognition can aid in developing “heuristics for recognizing extraterrestrial intelligence.” For example, participants in SETI “might look for very long phrases, modality blending (e.g., tasting shapes), noise that is actually music, and descriptions that articulate relationships that humans express kinesthetically as gestures and facial expressions.” He also talked about how current “advances in robotics and neuroscience are the beginnings of a process memory architecture that will become the foundation of a successful computational theory of intelligence.” And he pointed out that “consciousness is not a mystical phenomenon or a topic to be shunned, but is instead the key for understanding how human intelligence is possible at all, how it is distinguished from other forms of intelligence on this planet, and indeed, how it is distinguished from current computer systems. In some important ways, even simple programming languages exceed the capability of human consciousness. But in other ways, related to the flexibility of 'run-time' learning and relating perceptual-motor modalities, no computer system replicates the mechanism of human conceptual coordination.”

In his 2002 commencement address, he described his then-current NASA activities as follows: “I am drawing pictures of space vehicles on Mars, but now I'm living inside them, and actually pretending we are ON Mars. I've done that in the High Arctic of Canada on Devon Island and more recently in the Utah desert, where I was the Station Commander for two weeks.” He said that “For thirty years we've waited to carry space exploration forward. We're in a transition zone, what I like to call 'Standing on Columbus' dock.'...Today we are called by adventure to another land....It's OUR new land, a new frontier. We're going to Mars....But when?...More practically, we're going within 20 years. Some of you could be walking on Mars before you are forty years old. You just have to believe. Your...attitude...matters. You must believe in discovery and adventure. If you let other people say 'it can't be done,' I can promise you, you will be 50 years old like me one day, and we will STILL be sending tin cans around the Earth, round and round going nowhere.”

In an essay entitled “Living On Mars Time,” Clancey has described a two-week period in February 2004 that he spent in Pasadena “observing how geologists and engineers controlled the Mars Exploration Rovers. There were two active rovers near the equator on opposite sides of Mars, at places called Gusev Crater (the rover we called 'Spirit') and at Meridiani Planum ('Opportunity'). I was working with the Opportunity team. At the time...the Opportunity team was living their lives as if they were actually at Meridiani” - that is, living on Mars time, not Earth time.

In a 2010 talk about SETI he noted that “both the nature of consciousness in humans and our belief systems affect our notion of what intelligence can be, how it might communicate, and how we would attempt to communicate with it.” He stressed the importance of “break[ing] out of ways of thinking that are limiting SETI” and asked whether “questioning our assumptions about mortality, purpose, and humanity's long-term role in the Universe [could] inform SETI.”

Clancey told an audience in February 2012 that the MER mission “provides a new way of understanding how computer tools and social organization can be orchestrated to extend human capabilities” and that “the story of planetary exploration today is about the relation of people and robotic spacecraft—machines that are actually complex laboratories capable of operating in extreme cold with little power, packaged to handle the vibrations of launch, and work for years without repair. Sending these scientific instruments throughout the solar system is one of the great successes of the computer age and will surely mark our place in the history of science and exploration.”

At the end of a May 2012 talk to a group of Eagle Scouts he addressed the question “Are we alone? Are there other beings like us in the universe?” He said, “I think the universe is saying to us, 'Take a guess. The answer should be obvious' That could mean the Universe is an unimaginably large space full of a diversity of life and cultures – in the memorable words of Carl Sagan, there are billions and billions of planets like Earth.” He concluded by saying: “Everyday I remind myself of where I am and how we are part of this incredible hum and vibrancy of life. And I feel an immense privilege to be alive now, knowing and enjoying this gift.”

He has described his current professional activities as follows: “I am a scientist who helps NASA design human and robotic space missions, including what people will do (astronauts and flight controllers on earth) and the tools they will use (especially computer systems).” He has said that the skills required for his work are the ability “to observe and describe how people think and work (cognitive science, psychology, anthropology/ethnography),” to “invent new kinds of computer systems (computer science),” and “to think about complex interactions and recognize unclear ways of thinking (philosophy, mathematics).”

“I have always been a research scientist, rather than a professor,” he has written. “Working with students might have been exciting, but as a research scientist I have been able to focus on developing new ideas and new kinds of computer tools.” He advises aspiring scientists to “Carry out your own investigations, even if they have nothing to do with what your school offers you. Realize that many of the important ideas for the future are not in textbooks, but were published 100 years ago or more and have not necessarily been understood or appreciated by your teachers. This includes philosophy and psychology (such as the work of John Dewey) and what is called 'systems theory'....Science and technology are rapidly changing. You can contribute by finding the bits and pieces that interest you, becoming knowledgeable about those things, then bring them to the table when the world is ready."

He has described his recent writing as “spann[ing] a variety of topics that reconsider the relation of knowledge and memory: "situated robots," neuropsychological dysfunctions, and how policies and plans are interpreted in work settings (particularly how the nature of the scientific method is adapted for doing collaborative scientific work remotely on Mars).

== Professional memberships ==
Clancey was a founding member of the Institute for Research on Learning. He is on the Board of Directors of the Association of Mars Explorers and the CONTACT Conference. He is a member of the Mars Society, a member of the advisory board of the Constructivist Foundations, and chairman and Chief Technology Officer of Modernsoft, Inc. He has also been a fellow of the American College of Medical Informatics since 1986, of the Association for Advancement of Artificial Intelligence since 1991, and of the Association for Psychological Science since 2010.

== Miscellaneous activities ==
Clancey often speaks about space science at schools, museums, and other venues. He has given talks in over twenty countries. He has described himself as having presented the results of his research “in tutorials and keynote addresses in twenty-two countries.”

== Honors and awards ==
On an appointment to NASA from the Florida Institute for Human & Machine Cognition (Pensacola), Clancey and his team received the NASA Honor Award and the Johnson Space Center Exceptional Software Award for an “agent” system that automates all routine file transfers between the International Space Station and Mission Control in Houston.

Clancey received the 2014 Gardner-Lasser Aerospace History Literature Award for Working on Mars.

== Selected books ==
- Knowledge-Based Tutoring (1987)
- Contemplating Minds: A Forum for Artificial Intelligence (1994, with S. Smoliar and M. Stefik)
- Situated Cognition: On Human Knowledge and Computer Representations (1997)
- Conceptual Coordination: How the Mind Orders Experience In Time (1999)
- Working on Mars: Voyages of Scientific Discovery with the Mars Exploration Rovers (2014)

Conceptual Coordination
How the Mind orders Experience in Time

His 1999 book Conceptual Coordination: How the Mind Orders Experience in Time has been described in a review by Melanie Mitchell as a book “about the nature of human memory, and how it differs from processes in computers....In Clancey's view, memory consists not of the storage and retrieval of symbols, but of a dynamical process of activation of physically connected neural structures. New memories or concepts are embodied as physical relations between structures in the brain that include not only an encoding of some external contents but, very centrally, the perceptual and motor activities making up 'what I am doing now.' Remembering consists of an approximate re-activation of these structures, in place and in sequence, with the possibility of substitutions, reconstructions, and new interpretations. In this view, a few basic processes at the neural level can explain many different aspects of memory.” While Clancey has learned from thinkers like William James and the founders of Gestalt, his original contribution “is a detailed exposition and extension of these basic ideas, revealing the deep links between perceptual-motor skills and higher-level cognition, a detailed re-examination and recasting of well-known cognitive phenomena and models into this 'conceptual coordination' framework, yielding some interesting novel explanations, and a preliminary link to some recent research in neuroscience.”

Working on Mars

Working on Mars, published by MIT Press, describes how the Mars Exploration Rovers (MRS) have “changed the nature of planetary field science,” enabling his team at NASA’s Jet Propulsion Laboratory (JPL) in Pasadena to remotely operate the MRSs on the Martian surface and thus have a virtual experience of being on the red planet themselves. A reviewer of the book notes that “Clancey, while a computer scientist, is in Working on Mars more of an anthropologist at times, comparing and contrasting the people working on the mission. There are the differences between the scientists using the rovers to study Mars and the engineers who built and operate the rovers, roles that can lead to conflict but also cooperation, as he notes. There’s also differences within the science team, particularly between those whose background is working in the field and those who primarily work in the lab. The former often wanted to quickly move on to the next destination, while the latter often wanted to linger and perform more observations with their instruments.”

Working on Mars received the 2014 Gardner-Lasser Aerospace History Literature Award.

== Selected publications ==
- Clancey, W.J. 2009. "Becoming a Rover". In S. Turkle (Ed.), Simulation and Its Discontents, Cambridge: MIT Press, pp. 107–127.
- Clancey, W.J. 2006. "Clear Speaking about Machines: People are exploring Mars, not robots". AAAI Workshop: The Human Implications of Human-Robotic Interaction, Boston.
- Clancey, W.J. 2011. "Relating Modes of Thought". In T. Bartscherer and R. Coover (Eds.), Switching Codes, University of Chicago Press, pp. 161–183.
- Clancey, W.J., Sierhuis, M., Alena, R., Dowding, J., Scott, M., and van Hoof, R. 2006. "Power Agents: The Mobile Agents 2006 Field Test at MDRS". To appear in F. Crossman and R. Zubrin (eds.), On to Mars: Volume 3, Burlington, Canada: Apogee Books. [Mars Society Presentation]
- Clancey, W. J., Lee, P., Cockell, C., Braham, S., Shafto, M. 2006. "To the North Coast of Devon: Collaborative navigation while exploring unfamiliar terrain". In J. Clarke (Ed.) Mars Analog Research, Vol. 111, American Astronautical Society Science and Technology Series, San Diego: Univelt, Inc., pp. 197–226. AAS 06-263.
- Clancey, W.J. 2006. "Observation of work practices in natural settings". In A. Ericsson, N. Charness, P. Feltovich & R. Hoffman (Eds.), Cambridge Handbook on Expertise and Expert Performance. New York: Cambridge University Press, pp. 127–145.
- Clancey, W. J. 2008. "Scientific antecedents of situated cognition". In Philip Robbins and Murat Aydede (Eds.), Cambridge Handbook of Situated Cognition. New York: Cambridge University Press, pp. 11–34.
- Clancey, W.J, Sierhuis, M., Damer, B., Brodsky, B. 2005. "Cognitive modeling of social behaviors". In R. Sun (Ed.), Cognition and Multi-Agent Interaction: From Cognitive Modeling to Social Simulation. New York: Cambridge University Press, pp. 151–184.
- Clancey, W.J. 2006. "Participant observation of a Mars surface habitat mission simulation Habitation", 11(1/2) 27-47.
- Pedersen, L., Clancey, W.J., Sierhuis, M., Muscettola, N., Smith, D.E., Lees, D., Rajan, K., Ramakrishnan, S., Tompkins, P., Vera, A., Dayton, T. 2006. "Field demonstration of surface human-robotic exploration activity".AAAI-06 Spring Symposium: Where no human-robot team has gone before, Stanford, March.
- Clancey, W.J. 2004. "Roles for agent assistants in field science: Understanding personal projects and collaboration 34" (2) 125-137. Special Issue of IEEE Transactions on Systems, Man, and Cybernetics, Part C: Applications and Reviews, May.
- Clancey, W.J., Lowry, M., Nado, R., Sierhuis, M. 2011. "Software Productivity of Field Experiments Using the Mobile Agents Open Architecture with Workflow Interoperability". Proceedings of IEEE Fourth International Conference on Space Mission Challenges for Information Technology (SMC-IT), Palo Alto, CA, August 2011, pp. 85–92
