= Tamara J. Moore =

American scholar of engineering education

Tamara Jo Moore is an American scholar of engineering education, the Crowley Family Professor of Engineering Education and Purdue University Faculty Scholar in the Purdue University School of Engineering Education, and executive director of Purdue's INSPIRE Research Institute for Pre-College Engineering. Her research focuses on STEM integration, an approach to education in science, technology, engineering, and mathematics (STEM) that emphasizes the interdisciplinary connections between STEM fields rather than their boundaries. She was the first US student to obtain a doctorate in engineering education.

== Education and career ==
Moore studied mathematics with a minor in mathematics education as an undergraduate at Purdue University, and became a high school mathematics teacher. Returning to Purdue for graduate education in mathematics, she discovered the need for engineering students to understand the mathematics she had been teaching, and became interested in engineering education. After a second bachelor's degree in interdisciplinary engineering and master's degree in mathematics education, she completed her Ph.D. in engineering education in 2006, the first US student to obtain a doctorate in engineering education. Her doctoral dissertation, Student Team Functioning and the Effect on Mathematical Problem Solving in a First-Year Engineering Course, was jointly supervised by Richard Lesh and Heidi A. Diefes-Dux.

After completing her doctorate, in 2006, she became an assistant professor of mathematics education in the College of Education at the University of Minnesota. She returned to Purdue as an associate professor of engineering education in 2013, and was named as the Crowley Family Professor of Engineering Education in 2025.

== Recognition ==
Moore was a 2012 recipient of the Presidential Early Career Award for Scientists and Engineers, "for transformative research on how young students learn engineering concepts that integrates K-12 teacher development that can have a transformative underrepresented minority and under-privileged urban K-12 students".
