= Roy Pea =

American academic (born 1952)

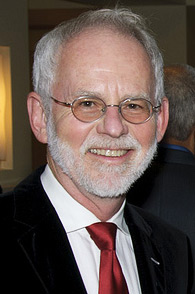
- Pea at TeachAids 2010 inaugural gala
- Born: Roy D. Pea; July 5, 1952 (age 74); Highland Park, Michigan
- Education: Michigan State University; University of Oxford
- Scientific career
- Fields: Learning sciences Educational technology Collaborative learning STEM learning
- Thesis: The development of negation in early child language (1978)
- Doctoral advisor: Jerome Bruner
- Doctoral students: Shuchi Grover
- Website: profiles.stanford.edu/roy-pea

Roy D. Pea is David Jacks Professor of Learning Sciences and Education at the Stanford Graduate School of Education. He has extensively published works in the field of the Learning Sciences and on learning technology design and made significant contributions since 1981 to the understanding of how people learn with technology.

== Education ==
Pea was born in Highland Park, Michigan on July 5, 1952. He received a dual major Bachelor of Arts degree in philosophy and psychology from Michigan State University with an independently declared major in Cognition (1974) working with his mentor and friend Stephen Toulmin, and later, a Doctor of Philosophy degree in developmental psychology from the University of Oxford, while studying as a Rhodes Scholar, working with his advisor Jerome Bruner.

=== Career and research ===
After studying child language and cognitive development from 1975 to 1980, his research concerns were attracted to understanding how innovations in computing and communications technologies can significantly influence learning, thinking, collaboration, and educational systems. Pea is a key figure in the development of the learning sciences as a recognized field of research and graduate study. He founded and served as the first director of the first learning sciences doctoral program, at Northwestern University (1991), directing the NSF-funded field-building Center for Innovative Learning Technologies, and launching in 2002 the Learning Sciences and Technology Design (LSTD) program at Stanford University. In 2004–2005, Pea was President of the International Society for the Learning Sciences.

Pea was one of the first research scientists to build the Bank Street College Center for Children in Technology (1981–1986), the first social sciences center devoted to studying children's learning with technology. Later, recruited by John Seely Brown and Jim Greeno to contribute to the development of the intellectual agenda of the Palo Alto, California–based think-tank, The Institute for Research on Learning (1988–1991), he developed their K-12 learning technologies emphasis, with pioneering work on distributed intelligence, learning by multimedia authoring, and science learning with dynamic diagramming tools.

=== Research centers and industry advisor ===
In 1996, after a year at the Center for Advanced Studies in the Behavioral Sciences, Pea was recruited to SRI International, where he worked with colleagues to build a major national Center for Technology in Learning, until recruited to Stanford University in 2001. At Stanford, Pea co-founded Stanford's H-STAR Institute (Human Sciences and Technologies Advanced Research) with Byron Reeves and is now H-STAR Institute Director. He was also co-director of the National Science Foundation-funded LIFE Center, one of six national Science of Learning Centers, whose studies seek to inform better bridging of the sciences of informal and formal learning from 2004 to 2017.

In addition to serving as founding editor of the Cambridge University Press Series Learning in Doing: Cognitive, Social and Computational Perspectives since 1987, Pea was co-author of the 2000 National Academy Press volume How People Learn, Co-Editor of the 2007 Book Video Research in the Learning Sciences, and co-author of the 2010 US National Educational Technology Plan.

Pea served from 1999 to 2009 as a founding director for Teachscape, a company he co-founded with Mark Atkinson in 1999 that provides comprehensive K-12 teacher professional development services incorporating web-based video case studies of standards-based teaching and communities of learners. In addition to academic research and teaching, he advises a number of companies, non-profits, research centers, projects and federal agencies or foundations involved in learning with technologies. Pea is also a learning sciences advisor to HIV/AIDS education nonprofit TeachAids.

He is a Fellow of the American Academy of Arts and Sciences, National Academy of Education , Association for Psychological Science, The Center for Advanced Study in the Behavioral Sciences, the American Educational Research Association, and the International Society for the Learning Sciences. His former doctoral students include Shuchi Grover.
