= Cindy Hmelo-Silver =

Distinguished Professor of Learning Sciences

- Occupations: Distinguished Professor; associate dean for Research and Development

Academic background
- Education: Vanderbilt University (PhD) State University of New York at Stony Brook (BS, MS)

Academic work
- Discipline: Learning sciences
- Institutions: Indiana University- Bloomington
- Main interests: Problem-based learning, collaborative inquiry, computer supported collaborative learning.

Cindy Esther Hmelo-Silver is a learning scientist and expert on problem-based learning, collaborative learning, the use of video for learning, and complex systems understanding. She is a Distinguished Professor of Learning Sciences, Barbara B. Jacobs Chair in Education and Technology, and the associate dean for Research and Development at Indiana University Bloomington. She is co-principal investigator and education research lead of the EngageAI Institute, which conducts research on narrative-centered learning technologies and collaborative learning.

Hmelo-Silver is an active member of the International Society for the Learning Sciences, formerly serving as Editor of the Journal of the Learning Sciences. She was named a fellow of the American Educational Research Association in 2016. She has authored numerous articles in peer-reviewed journals and has contributed to several books on learning sciences and educational psychology. Her work is widely cited, and has influenced both theoretical frameworks and practical applications in education. Hmelo-Silver was given the "Outstanding Practice Award" by the Association for Educational Communications and Technology (AECT) in 2020, and was elected to the American Academy of Arts and Sciences in 2023. Her work has been featured on websites including EurekAlert! and Building Indiana.

== Biography ==
Hmelo-Silver earned her B.S. in Cardiorespiratory Sciences from the State University of New York at Stony Brook in 1978. She obtained her MS in Educational Computing at State University of New York at Stony Brook in 1985. She subsequently attended Vanderbilt University, where she completed her Ph.D. in Cognitive Studies with a minor in Educational Technology in 1994. Her thesis topic was Development of independent learning and thinking: A study of medical problem-solving and problem-based learning, completed under the advisement of Dr. John Bransford.

From 1994-1996, Hmelo-Silver worked as a postdoctoral researcher and project manager at Georgia Tech. She moved to the Learning Research and Development Center at the University of Pittsburgh in 1996 to work as a research associate. In 1998, Hmelo-Smith joined the faculty of the Graduate School of Education at Rutgers University, progressing from Assistant Professor to Department Chair of Educational Psychology. In 2014, she was appointed professor of Learning Sciences and director of the Center for Research on Learning and Technology at Indiana University Bloomington.

== Research ==
Hmelo-Silver investigates how students engage in inquiry learning, the role of social interaction in learning, and how teachers facilitate inquiry learning. She also studies how people learn about complex phenomena and how technology can support that learning. Some of her most cited work examines the nature of learning when students engage in problem-based learning and the empirical evidence supporting this pedagogical approach. Other work focuses on collaborative inquiry, collaborative knowledge construction and computer-supported collaborative learning. Hmelo-Silver has also studied the role of technology to support social knowledge construction and collaborative learning and problem-solving.

Hmelo-Silver has received substantial funding for her research through the National Science Foundation. One of her projects Big Data from Small Groups: Learning Analytics and Adaptive Support in Game-based Collaborative Learning aimed to develop a new model of Computer Supported Collaborative Learning (CSCL) that combines advantages of game-based learning with problem-based learning. Effective game-based learning environments combine rich scenarios with engaging activities in support of student learning. Key outcomes of the project include a model of collaborative scaffolding for game-based learning that is usable in classrooms to help students learn STEM content and learning analytics designed to support the teacher in the roles of guide and collaborator.

She is the education lead on the NSF AI Institute for Engaged Learning (EngageAI, engageAI.org) that aims to advance natural language processing, computer vision and machine learning by conducting research on narrative-centered learning technologies, embodied conversational agents and multi-modal learning analytics to create deeply engaging, collaborative, story-based learning experiences. Their project, Integrating AI Learning into Middle School Science through Natural Language Processing, investigates how professional development and participatory co-design can be tailored to support teachers' competencies and sense of preparedness in bringing artificial intelligence and natural language processing into science classrooms. Another project, Augmented Cognition for Teaching: Transforming Teacher Work with Intelligent Cognitive Assistants, investigates how intelligent cognitive assistants for teachers can transform work to increase teacher performance and quality of working life. The project centers on the design, development, and evaluation of the Intelligent Augmented Cognition for Teaching (I-ACT) framework for intelligent cognitive assistants for teachers.

Hmelo-Silver and her colleagues Judi Fusco, Krista Glazewski, Haesol Bae, and Joshua Danish were awarded an NSF grant for the project Hearing Each Other's Voices: Community Models for Professional Learning for Teachers, STEM Coaches and Researchers. The project is focused to support teachers, STEM coaches and researchers in sharing their knowledge so that they can learn from one another. She is also part of a team of researchers who received a $1.1M NSF grant to fund study of student group engagement in STEM activities.

Hmelo-Silver frequently presents her research at national and international conferences, contributing to the global dialogue on effective teaching and learning strategies. Some of her recent presentations include: NLP4Science: Designing a Platform for Integrating Natural Language Processing in Middle School Science Classrooms at the IEEE symposium on Visual Languages and Human-Centric Computing 2023, Is Elementary AI Education Possible? at the SIGCSE 2023 technical symposium.

== Books ==
- Evensen, D. H., Hmelo, C. E. (2000). Problem-based learning: A research perspective on learning interactions. Routledge. https://doi.org/10.4324/9781410604989
- Fischer, F., Hmelo-Silver, C. E., Goldman, S. R., & Reimann, P. (Eds.) (2018). International handbook of the learning sciences. Routledge. https://doi.org/10.4324/9781315617572
- Hmelo-Silver, C. E., Chinn, C., Chan, C., & O'Donnell, A. (Eds.) (2013). The international handbook of collaborative learning. Routledge. https://doi.org/10.4324/9780203837290
- Kumpulainen, K., Hmelo-Silver, C. E., & César, M. (Eds.) (2009). Investigating classroom interaction: Methodologies in action. Sense Publishers.
- O'Donnell, A.M., Hmelo-Silver, C.E., & Erkens, G. (Eds.). (2005). Collaborative learning, reasoning, and technology. Routledge. https://doi.org/10.4324/9780203826843

== Other representative publications ==
- Eberbach, C., Hmelo-Silver, C. E., Jordan, R., Taylor, J., & Hunter, R. (2021). Multidimensional Trajectories for understanding ecosystems. Science Education. 105, 521–540 DOI: 10.1002/sce.21613
- Gomoll, A., Hmelo-Silver, C. E., & Šabanović, S. (2022). Co-constructing Professional Vision: Teacher and Researcher Learning in Co-Design. Cognition and Instruction, 40(1), 7-26. https://doi.org/10.1080/07370008.2021.2010210
- Hmelo-Silver, C.E. (2004). Problem-based learning: What and how do students learn? Educational Psychology Review 16, 235–266. https://doi.org/10.1023/B:EDPR.0000034022.16470.f3
- Hmelo-Silver, C. E., & Barrows, H. S. (2006). Goals and strategies of a problem-based learning facilitator. Interdisciplinary Journal of Problem-Based Learning, 1(1). https://doi.org/10.7771/1541-5015.1004
- Hmelo-Silver, C. E., Duncan, R. G., & Chinn, C. A. (2007). Scaffolding and achievement in problem-based and inquiry learning: A response to Kirschner, Sweller, and Clark (2006). Educational Psychologist, 42(2), 99–107. https://doi.org/10.1080/00461520701263368
- Hmelo-Silver, C. E., Marathe, S., & Liu, L. (2007). Fish swim, rocks sit, and lungs breathe: Expert-novice understanding of complex systems. The Journal of the Learning Sciences, 16(3), 307-331. https://doi.org/10.1080/10508400701413401
- Hmelo‐Silver, C. E., & Pfeffer, M. G. (2004). Comparing expert and novice understanding of a complex system from the perspective of structures, behaviors, and functions. Cognitive Science, 28(1), 127-138. https://doi.org/10.1207/s15516709cog2801_7
- Jeong, H. & Hmelo-Silver, C. E. (2016). Seven affordances of CSCL Technology: How can technology support collaborative learning. Educational Psychologist. 51, 247-265.*Rogat, T. K., Hmelo-Silver, C. E., Cheng, B., Traynor, A., Adeoye, T., Gomoll, A., & Downing, B. (2022). A Multidimensional Framework of Groups’ Productive Disciplinary Engagement. Frontline Learning Research, 10(2), 1-21.
- Saleh, A., Phillips, T. M., Hmelo-Silver, C. E., Glazewski, K.D., Mott., B. W., & Lester, J.C. (2022). A learning analytics approach towards understanding collaborative inquiry in a problem-based learning environment. British Journal of Educational Technology, 53, 1321-1342. https://doi.org/10.1111/bjet.13198.
