= Citizen Design Science =

Citizen Design Science is the combination of Citizen Science and Design Science. Design Science is known since the early 1960s when Buckminster Fuller defined it as systematic designing, whereas half a decade later Herbert A. Simon saw it more as the study of the design process. The term Citizen Science emerged in the 1990s as work that citizens of all ages and backgrounds conduct under the guidance of scientists, collecting data or inventing processes or artefacts. A contemporary example is the Zooniverse platform that enables people to “contribute to real discoveries in fields ranging from astronomy to zoology”. Citizen Design Science is a combination of both concepts for urban systems: it adds the combination of human observation, cognition, experience and local knowledge into a scientific framework that improves the planning, design, management and transformation of buildings and cities. Design Science contributes the methods and instruments, Citizen Science adds data and inventions. Thus, Citizen Design Science bundles individual observations and inventions into a bottom up flow of data and information to improve the planning and functioning of a city. As such this concept is taught at ETH Zurich and online
