= Shuchi Grover =

American learning scientist

- Education: Stanford University; Harvard University
- Scientific career
- Fields: Computer science education Computational thinking STEM education Data science AI education
- Thesis: Foundations for advancing computational thinking : balanced designs for deeper learning in an online computer science course for middle school students (2014)
- Doctoral advisor: Roy Pea
- Website: www.shuchigrover.com

Shuchi Grover is an Indian-American learning scientist and computer scientist whose work as a computer science education and AI literacy researcher is widely recognized. Her seminal research on computational thinking and how to design effective computationally rich educational experiences for children has shaped policies and curricula on computational literacy worldwide.

== Early life and education ==
Grover completed her undergraduate studies in India at Birla Institute of Technology and Science, Pilani, majoring in computer science and physics. She earned a master's degree in computer science from Case Western Reserve University where her masters thesis involved developing software for music students. As part of this project, she used digital repositories to store score sheets. It was her first introduction to the potential of technology to accelerate student learning. After a career in software engineering, she made a shift to diverse issues in education like teaching and learning with technology, online learning, and computational thinking in children. She earned a master's degree in technology, Innovation, and Education at Harvard, before moving to California. Grover focused on learning sciences at Stanford University for her doctoral research, which investigated advanced computational thinking for deep learning in middle school students and was supervised by Roy Pea. She developed a 6-week Stanford OpenEdX course to introduce middle school students to computer sciences.

== Research and career ==
In 2014, she argued that to increase the number of women in technology, computer science should be taught in US schools, and computer scientists should act to diminish the "nerd" stereotype.

Grover has led or co-led several research projects funded by the National Science Foundation. She has authored over 100 well-cited peer-reviewed conference papers and journal articles, book chapters, and mainstream articles. Grover's book on Computer Science in K-12: An A-to-Z Handbook on Teaching Programming included contributions from 40 researchers and educators of computer science from around the world.

Grover's research on developing computational competencies in school education is recognized globally. She advises ministries of education, organizations such as OECD's Programme for International Student Assessment (PISA), EU's Joint Research Centre, and national well as trans-national education projects. She is invited for keynote addresses and presentations worldwide.

== Awards and recognition ==
In 2010, Grover was awarded an Amir Lopatin Fellowship to study computational thinking in K-12 students. She is particularly interested in how computational learning could be a social driver. As part of the fellowship, Grover studied middle school students in Bangalore. Her research investigated the various dimensions of computational thinking and how children choose what to value and engage with.

The US National Academies Division of Behavioral and Social Sciences and Education selected Grover for the 2024 Henry and Bryna David award, given to a leading researcher who has drawn insights from the behavioral and social sciences to inform public policy.

Dr. Shuchi Grover's paper on Teaching AI in K-12: Lessons, Issues, and Guidance won the best paper award at the Association for Computing Machinery (ACM)'s SIGCSE Technical Symposium on Computer Science Education conference in March 2024.

=== Selected publications ===
- Grover, Shuchi; Pea, Roy (2013). "Computational Thinking in K–12". Educational Researcher. 42 (1): 38–43. doi:10.3102/0013189x12463051. ISSN 0013-189X. S2CID 145509282.
- Grover, Shuchi; Pea, Roy; Cooper, Stephen (2015-04-03). "Designing for deeper learning in a blended computer science course for middle school students". Computer Science Education. 25 (2): 199–237. Bibcode:2015CSEd...25..199G. doi:10.1080/08993408.2015.1033142. ISSN 0899-3408. S2CID 557120.
- Grover, Shuchi; Pea, Roy (2018), "Computational Thinking: A Competency Whose Time Has Come", Computer Science Education, Bloomsbury Academic, doi:10.5040/9781350057142.ch-003, ISBN 978-1-3500-5714-2
