= Marcia Linn =

American professor and cognitive scientist

Marcia C. Linn
- Education: B.A. Psychology & Statistics, Stanford University (1965) M.A. Educational Psychology, Stanford University (1967) Ph.D. Educational Psychology, Stanford University (1970)
- Occupations: Professor of Cognition and Development
- Scientific career
- Workplaces: University of California, Berkeley
- Thesis: Effects of a training procedure on matrix performance and on transfer tasks (1970)
- Doctoral advisor: Lee Cronbach
- Doctoral students: Elizabeth Davis
- Website: Homepage, Faculty profile

Marcia C. Linn (née Cyrog) is an American professor, specializing in personal development and cognitive processes. As of early 2025, she is the Evelyn Lois Corey Professor of Instructional Science in the Berkeley School of Education at the University of California, Berkeley.

== Early life and education ==
Linn was born in Milwaukee, Wisconsin, to Frances and George Cyrog. Her mother, Frances, was the principal of Sorenson School in Whittier, California, and developed a philosophy for individualized elementary school reading instruction. Linn's father was a supervisor in the postal service as well as a rockhound who founded the Whittier Gem and Mineral Society. Linn has stated that her interest in science stems from her parents.

Linn received a B.A. in Psychology and Statistics (1965) and an M.A. in Educational Psychology (1967). She completed her Ph.D. in Educational Psychology (1970) from Stanford University, working under the mentorship of Lee Cronbach.

In 1967–68, Linn worked with Jean Piaget and other researchers at the Institute Jean Jacques Rousseau in Geneva, Switzerland. While in Geneva, Linn spent time in schools, interviewing students using the Piagetian clinical method. When she returned to California, Linn conducted many interviews in which she asked students to explore scientific problems, which formed the basis for her perspective on knowledge integration.

== Academic career ==
Linn was a Research Psychologist at the Lawrence Hall of Science (1970–1987) and led the ACCEL program, a National Science Foundation-funded research project that investigated the cognitive consequences of computer environments for learning. She won an Apple Wheels for the Mind grant in 1985 for The Computer as Lab Partner, a project to bring Apple computers equipped with sensing probes into schools. With Robert Tinker, she developed the first Microcomputer-based Labs and probeware for middle school science. From 1989 to 1996, Marcia was director of the Instructional Technology Program at the UC Berkeley.

In 1983, she was Fulbright Professor at the Weizmann Institute of Science in Rehovot, Israel. The project Assessing the Cognitive Consequences of Computer Environments for Learning documented the uses of personal computers in classrooms. In 1986, she received a three-year grant from the National Science Foundation to study Autonomous Learning Materials for Pascal Courses and studied programming instruction.

In 1995–1996, 2001–2002, and 2010–2011, Linn was a fellow at the Center for Advanced Study in Behavioral Sciences in Stanford, California. In 2008–2009, she was President of the International Society for the Learning Sciences. Linn is a member of the National Academy of Education and a Fellow of the American Association for the Advancement of Science, the American Psychological Association, and the Association for Psychological Science. She has served as Chair of the AAAS Education Section and as President of the International Society of the Learning Sciences. Her board services include the American Association for the Advancement of Science, the Graduate Record Examination Board of the Educational Testing Service, the James S. McDonnell Foundation Cognitive Studies in Education Practice, and the Directorate for Education and Human Resources at the National Science Foundation.

Linn's books include Computers, Teachers, Peers (2000), Internet Environments for Science Education (2004), Designing Coherent Science Education (2008), WISE Science (2009), and Science Learning and Instruction: Taking Advantage of Technology to Promote Knowledge Integration (2011). Her research on how students learn computer science and middle-school science led her to describe the knowledge integration framework.

In 2024, she directed the NSF-funded Technology-Enhanced Learning in Science (TELS) center and the Web-based Inquiry Science Environment (WISE).

== Awards ==
In 1983, she won one of two grants awarded by the National Institute of Education. Other awards include the National Association for Research in Science Teaching Award for Lifelong Distinguished Contributions to Science Education and the Council of Scientific Society President's first Educational Research Award.
