= George Pake =

American physicist

- Born: April 1, 1924; Jefferson, Ohio
- Died: March 4, 2004 (aged 79); Tucson, Arizona
- Education: Carnegie Institute of Technology; Harvard University
- Awards: IRI Medal (1986); National Medal of Science (1987)
- Scientific career
- Fields: Physicist
- Workplaces: Washington University in St. Louis; Xerox PARC; Institute for Research on Learning
- Doctoral advisor: Edward Mills Purcell

George Edward Pake (April 1, 1924 – March 4, 2004) was a physicist, academic, and research executive primarily known for helping found Xerox PARC.

== Early life ==
Pake was raised in Kent, Ohio. His father was an English instructor at Kent State University. His mother was a schoolteacher.

Pake was exempted from service in the United States Armed Forces during World War II due to scoliosis. He earned bachelor's and master's degrees from the Carnegie Institute of Technology and his doctorate in physics at Harvard University in 1948.

== Career ==
Much of his early research at Harvard University focused on the topic of nuclear magnetic resonance (NMR) spectroscopy. There, he discovered the multiplet structure produced by the dipolar coupling of two nuclear spins. In his honor, this multiplet is now known as the Pake doublet and forms the basis for NMR-based inter-atomic distance measurements and molecular structure determination.

After four years as a physics professor at Washington University in St. Louis, Pake became the head of the physics department at age 28. He later went on to become provost of the university from 1962 to 1970 before leaving to serve as founding director of Xerox PARC.

Pake served on the President's Science Advisory Committee (1965-1969). He was president of the American Physical Society in 1977.

PARC assembled a first-rate collection of research talent, especially in the area of computer science. During Pake's years running Xerox PARC, the research center invented the laser printer and pioneered the use of a computer "desktop" which functioned by clicking on "icons." This has since become the computer industry standard.

Despite advocacy by Pake, the Xerox Corporation never chose to open a personal computer division. Pake left Xerox in 1986 to direct the nonprofit Institute for Research on Learning in Palo Alto. He remained director emeritus until the time of his death.

Late in life, Pake began writing two different books, both with the collaborator Andrew Szanton. Pake's death, of heart failure on March 4, 2004, in Tucson, Arizona, interrupted both book projects.

== Awards ==
In 1986, Pake was awarded the IRI Medal from the Industrial Research Institute for recognition of his leadership in the field of technology and innovation. Pake was also a recipient of the National Medal of Science in 1987 and continued to visit PARC long after his 1986 retirement from Xerox.

== George E. Pake Prize ==
Since 1984, the American Physical Society has been awarding the George E. Pake Prize, endowed in 1983 by the Xerox Corporation, to recognize outstanding work by physicists combining original research accomplishments with leadership in the management of research or development in industry.

== Personal life ==
Pake married Marjorie Semon on May 31, 1947; they had four children.
