= Theodore Kisiel =

American philosopher (1930–2021)

Theodore Joseph Kisiel (October 30, 1930 – December 25, 2021) was an American philosopher. He was Distinguished Research Professor Emeritus of philosophy at Northern Illinois University, as well as a well-known translator of and commentator on the works of Martin Heidegger.

== Biography ==
Kisiel was born Brackenridge, Pennsylvania.

Kisiel's work focused on the development of Heidegger's early thought. According to Kisiel, Heidegger viewed the entire history of both Eastern and Western philosophy (starting with Parmenides) as dominated by ontology, or "the metaphysics of permanent presence". Heidegger saw his work as focusing instead on the temporal, contingent, "thrown" existence of the individual. His students include Govert Schüller and Gerry Stahl.

Kisiel died on December 25, 2021 in Winfield, Illinois, at the age of 91.

== Bibliography ==
- The Genesis of Heidegger's Being and Time, Berkeley: University of California Press, 1993.
- Heidegger's Way of Thought: Critical and Interpretative Signposts, 2002 ISBN 0-8264-5736-3
- "Heidegger's Gesamtausgabe: An International Scandal of Scholarship", Philosophy Today 39 (1995), pp. 3–15.

== See also ==
- Criticism of the Heidegger Gesamtausgabe
