= Design-based research =

Research approach in the learning sciences

Design-based research (DBR) is a type of research methodology used by researchers in the learning sciences, which is a sub-field of education. The basic process of DBR involves developing solutions (called "interventions") to problems. Then, the interventions are put to use to test how well they work. The iterations may then be adapted and re-tested to gather more data. The purpose of this approach is to generate new theories and frameworks for conceptualizing learning, instruction, design processes, and educational reform. Data analysis often takes the form of iterative comparisons.

== Role within the learning sciences ==
Methodologically, the learning sciences differs from other fields in educational research. It focuses on the study of learners, their localities, and their communities. The design-based research methodology is often used by learning scientists in their inquiries because this methodological framework considers the subject of study to be a complex system involving emergent properties that arise from the interaction of more variables than are initially known to researchers, including variables stemming from the researchers themselves. Rather than attempting to isolate all the various factors that impact learning as in traditional research, the learning sciences employ design based research methodologies which appeal to an approach to the study of learning – in particular human learning both inside and outside of school – that embraces the complex system nature of learning systems.

Learning scientists often look at the interactions amongst variables as key components to study, yet acknowledge that within learning environments the interactions are often too complex to study all or completely understand. This stance has been validated by the findings of Cronbach and Snow (1977), which suggest that Aptitude-Treatment Interactions, where variables are isolated in an effort to determine what factors "most" influence learning, will not be informative but rather inaccurate and potentially misleading if used as a ground for educational decisions or educational research of complex learning situations such as those characteristic of human beings in their lived experiences.

== History and controversy ==
The method was first proposed as design-experiments by Allan Collins in 1990 and Ann Brown in 1992. Collins originally proposed design-experiments as contributing to a 'design science', like aeronautics or artificial intelligence, rather than analytic science that seeks to explain natural phenomena. In the mid-1990s, a group called the National Design Experiment Consortium was founded by the late Jan Hawkins, then of Educational Development Corporation, to refine the method. In 1999, Christopher Hoadley founded the Design-Based Research Collective, funded by the Spencer Foundation, and coined the modern term for the method.

Design-based research methodologies are often viewed as non-scientific by traditional experimental psychologists because design-based research does not follow formal definitions of scientific method. In 2000, Charles Desforges famously called design experiments 'neither designed, nor experiments'. Design-based research is viewed as an outgrowth of product development processes rather than scientific research. Critics see "design science" as an application of science to develop products or instructional interventions rather than scientific research. Some researchers question whether design-based research is primarily useful as an exploratory research method geared towards producing designed artifacts, or whether it can validly test robust theories that are contingent on designed artifacts or interventions.

== Varieties and forms of design-based research methodologies ==
As mentioned in the conclusion to the 2008 ICLS keynote (), there are several forms of design based research now in use in education research. These are associated with papers from:

- Brown and Collins
- Cobb
- Hmelo-Silver
- Kelly & Lesh

== Related works ==
- Anderson, T., & Shattuck, J. (2012). "Design-based research: A decade of progress in education research?" Educational Researcher, 41(1), 16–25. doi:10.3102/0013189X11428813
- Bannan-Ritland, B. (2003). "The role of design in research: The integrative learning design framework". Educational Researcher. 32(1) 21–24.
- Collins, A. (1992). "Toward a Design Science of Education". In E. Scanlon & T. O'Shea (Eds.), New directions in educational technology (pp. 15–22). New York: Springer-Verlag.
- Cobb, P., Confrey, J. diSessa, A., Lehrer, R. and Schauble, L. (2003). "Design Experiments in Educational Research". Educational Researcher. 32(1) 9–13.
- Design-Based Research Collective. (2003). "Design-based research: An emerging paradigm for educational inquiry." Educational Researcher, 32(1), 5–8, 35–37. http://www.designbasedresearch.org/reppubs/DBRC2003.pdf
- Kelly, A. E. (2004). "Design research in education: Yes, but is it methodological?" The Journal of the Learning Sciences, 13(1), 115–128. doi:10.1207/s15327809jls1301_6
- Mor, Y. (2010) 'A Design Approach to Research in Technology Enhanced Mathematics Education', PhD thesis, Institute of Education, University of London
- Reeves, T., Herrington, J. and Oliver, R. (2005) "Design Research: A Socially Responsible Approach to Instructional Technology Research in Higher Education". Journal of Computing in Higher Education, 16(2), 97–116.
- Shavelson, R. J. and Towne, L. (Eds.) (2002) Scientific Research in Education. National Academy Press. Washington D.C.
- Shavelson, R. J., Phillips, D. C., Towne, L., & Feuer, M. J. (2003). "On the science of educational design studies". Educational Researcher, 32(1), 25–28.

== See also ==
- Design Science Methodology
- Design-based learning
