= Web-based Inquiry Science Environment =

The Web-based Inquiry Science Environment (WISE) is a program hosted by University of California, Berkeley and supported by the National Science Foundation. It provides a platform for creating inquiry-based science projects for middle school and high school students to work collaboratively using evidence and resources from the Web. WISE inquiry projects are typically developed by teams including teachers, researchers, and scientists. These projects range in duration from two days to four weeks, suitable for teachers in every science topic at all grade levels. The use of Internet materials provides the foundation of WISE. All projects make use of some content from the World Wide Web, as well as additional Web pages authored for purposes of the project. This approach helps students learn to use the Internet for inquiry, critiquing web sites, designing approaches, or comparing arguments. Typical projects engage students in designing solutions to problems, debating contemporary science controversies, investigating scientific phenomena (e.g. thermal equilibrium in the classroom), or critiquing scientific claims found in web sites.

WISE projects can also incorporate Java applets, flash models, forums to facilitate online discussions, data collection, drawing, argument creation, resource sharing, branching, concept mapping and other built-in components. WISE is entirely browser-based, meaning that students only need access to a computer with an Internet connection, with no required software other than the Web browser. All student work is saved on central project servers that enable student accounts and teacher accounts to be coordinated, with special Web environments designed to support teachers and students. Students can access their work from any computer on the Internet. Teachers can choose from the library of curriculum projects in the WISE Teacher's Portal, each accompanied by a set of materials including a detailed lesson plan, pre and post assessments, connections to the AAAS National standards, tools for setting up a custom grading scheme, and even a software tool that enables customization of the WISE project for local issues, geographical features or student populations. Teachers can monitor and grade student work in real time, provide formative feedback during a project run, and manage their student accounts.

WISE provides an interface to facilitate the authoring of new projects, with numerous technology-based components including online discussions, data collection, drawing, argument creation, resource sharing, concept mapping and other built-in tools. Developers can also include custom tools of their own design. Projects are further customizable by teachers and other end users through the same interface to better meet the needs of their students and constraints of local educational settings. The website provides rich descriptions of the WISE learning environment, a library of inquiry projects for students and teachers, a teacher support center, and the complete authoring environment.
