= Institute for Research on Learning =

American think tank

The Institute for Research on Learning (IRL) in Palo Alto, California was co-founded by John Seely Brown, then chief research scientist at the Palo Alto Research Center, and James Greeno, Professor of Education at Stanford University, with the support of David Kearns, CEO of Xerox Corporation in 1986 through a grant from the Xerox Foundation. It operated from 1986 to 2000 as an independent cross-disciplinary think tank with a mission to study learning in all its forms and sites.

George Pake, who founded Xerox Palo Alto Research Corporation in 1970 became IRL's first director and moved with the institute first to Hanover Street, Palo Alto and then to Willow Place, Menlo Park. Greeno was Associate Director of IRL 1987-1991 and Acting Director for a few months during 1991. From 1992 to 1999 Peter Henschel was Executive Director.

IRL was a nonprofit research organization that looked at learning in schools, workplaces, and informal settings, using collaborative, multidisciplinary teams. Research questions were based in real-world problems and settings defined in partnership with people in schools and workplaces who championed these activities. The institute had a significant impact on education and knowledge management (among many other fields) not only in the US but globally through the development of the concept of a community of practice.

== Approach to Learning ==
The first group of researchers was recruited from Stanford University, the University of California at Berkeley, and from Xerox PARC, in disciplines including anthropology, computer science, education, psychology, and linguistics.

The institute's approach to learning was expressed through its Seven Principles of Learning and the concept of communities of practice.

=== IRL's Seven Principles of Learning ===
1. Learning is fundamentally social.
2. Knowledge is integrated in the life of communities.
3. Learning is an act of membership.
4. Knowing depends on engagement in practice.
5. Engagement is inseparable from empowerment.
6. “Failure to Learn” is the normal result of exclusion from participation.
7. We already have a society of lifelong learners.

== IRL’s Core Capabilities ==
IRL defined its core capabilities as:

- Learning to see Learning
- Design for Learning
- Learning and Work Design
- Learning, Identity and Diversity

IRL's projects were grouped into research settings:

Research of Learning in the Classroom

- Funding from Education Grants. (NSF, Hearst Foundation and others)
- Researchers: Shelley Goldman, Ted Kahn, Jim Greeno, Jennifer Knudsen, Ray McDermott, Angela Booker, Karen Cole, Ralph Manak, Judit Moschkovich, Roy Pea, Tina Syer, and more.
- Partners and clients: NSF, US Dept. of Education, Hearst Foundation, Spencer Foundation, Stanford University, Middle Schools in the Bay Area and more.
- Research focused on Learning in the K 8- 12 classroom, with special emphasis on mathematics as the greatest hurdle to school success. Researchers developed alternatives to, and support of, traditional math modules by embedding mathematical topics in practical tasks (e.g. design of a building) executed in groups and with computers.

Research on Learning in the Workplace

- Financed through corporate sponsorship.
- Research projects for corporate clients. Research topics were co-developed with the corporate clients to have academic and corporate relevance. Results were shared with the client and a network of affiliates in the form of articles, reports and presentations.
- Researchers: Libby Bishop, Melissa Cefkin, William Clancey, Chris Darrouzet, Gitte Jordan, Ted Kahn, Charlotte Linde, Patricia Sachs, Susan Stucky, Eric Vinkhuyzen, Etienne Wenger, Marilyn and Jack Whalen, Helga Wild, and more.
- Partners and clients: e.g. Xerox Corporation, State Farm Insurance, Hewlett-Packard, Sun Microsystems, Nynex, Steelcase, Herman Miller, IDEO, Stanford University, and more.

Research Initiative on Learning, Identity and Diversity

- Researchers: Penny Eckert, Charlotte Linde, working on social identity and memory through sociolinguistic analysis and the analysis of an organization's (his)tories.

== History and Philosophy of IRL ==
The chief scientist at Palo Alto Research Center (PARC), John Seely Brown, psychologist by training, saw the computer revolution open up the possibility of dramatic changes in learning. He gained the support of David Kearns, CEO of Xerox Corporation, who encouraged the Xerox Foundation to grant a substantial amount of money to the creation of an institution to study learning and innovation in the context of the use of computers.

The institute was to operate as an independent entity, even though it was incubated with the knowledge and the assistance of key people from Xerox PARC. It gradually weaned itself from dependence on the grant and earned its keep by the fruits of its research.

The institute was named Institute for Research on Learning (IRL) and founded in 1988. Its first director was George Pake, a physicist from PARC. Its staff was composed of an inter-disciplinary group of researchers: recruited in part from PARC and from Stanford and UC Berkeley. Researchers came from the disciplines of education, linguistics, anthropology, computer science, and psychology. Of particular note, James G. Greeno, a senior educational psychologist, worked to define themes and guide research projects throughout IRL's history. This first generation of researchers developed the vision and methodology for the institute. They were inspired by anthropology's conception of learning as a social and cultural phenomenon and inspired by books like “Situated Learning” (Co-authors Jean Lave and Etienne Wenger were members of the institute).

The institute adopted ethnography as its main research method, a factor that distinguished it in major ways from other thinktanks. Under this influence the initial image of learning as an individual's interaction with knowledge mediated possibly by computational tools made way for a vision of learning as apprenticeship. In apprenticeship the knowledge content could not be isolated from the learner's social status in a socio-cultural field: apprentices had to be received into a community – a guild, profession or team – and migrated within this group from the periphery towards greater and greater participation in the social and professional activities.

The learning process was seen to be substantially one of interaction with the members of one's own community or group first and with related social groups and networks secondarily. From gaining access to a practice to learning how it is carried out by this group, to collaborating with peers on a shared task or agenda, and finally socializing others as an established member – all these were aspects of learning but also evidence of transformations of identity. They establish both the position of the learner and the content of what is to be learned as part of a social practice shaped by and shaping a material and institutional environment.

IRL's social perspective opened up areas of learning where none had been suspected before. Learning was found to be present not just in schools and training camps, but also in clubs, midwifery, prisons, neighborhoods, in highly formalized as well as highly informal settings.

In traditional schools and workplaces, social interaction was often frowned upon as an interruption of work proper. It was the institute's conviction and commitment to convince the public otherwise. The school part of the institute took on the key gatekeeper in Middle School, mathematics, and created social and practical learning substitutes for the individualized learning tasks in the school curriculum. For instance, instead of teaching fractions in the traditional manner through a series of manipulations of numbers, they developed collaborative design exercises that involved fractions in a practical context – designing a room layout and furniture – that taught students the relevance of fractions in maintaining proportions and gave them a grounded understanding as well as a practical use.

The analogous research on the industry side consisted in ethnographic projects in organizations to uncover social forms of learning inside the workplace and to enhance what benefits they could bring to the corporation. These enhancements could relate to the spatial and institutional aspects of work: Several large projects were dedicated to designing work processes, strategies and workplaces in support of the social aspects of work. They could focus on furniture and technology, on organizational processes or on team building, orientation and training. What all had in common was the theoretical position of the institute – to treat a corporation as a social entity composed of individuals and communities formed around key practices or competencies. Communities-of-Practice were seen as building blocks for learning and identity formation and as holders of organizational know-how.

During its twelve years of pioneering research, IRL had developed and disseminated many radical advances in social and cognitive science: the use of systematic ethnographic methods to study organizations, the social approach to learning, research projects with corporate clients, emphasis on communities and social networks as instrumental for innovation and organizational knowledge, and the awareness of the informal aspects of an organization. Furthermore, as venue for broad dissemination, in 1989, John Seely Brown and Roy Pea co-founded The Cambridge University Press book series Learning in Doing: Social, Cognitive, and Computational Perspectives - in over 30 years, close to 50 book titles were published to illuminate and contribute to research scholarship pursuant to the core themes and advances wrought by IRL and its knowledge networks.

Throughout those twelve years the institute managed to keep itself afloat through national and other grants and specialized corporate projects. It hired researchers, developed a network of affiliates and corporate sponsors, conducted industry retreats, delivered reports and presentations, and contributed to journals and conferences. In 2000, as the dotcom bubble was bursting, funding for learning research projects became hard to come by. After the institute lost a major project at the end of its fiscal year, the decision was made to cease operations. A number of key educational projects and research staff were transferred into WestEd, a nonpartisan, nonprofit research, development, and service agency which also worked with education and other communities throughout the United States and abroad.

After the institute closed, staff members and researchers dispersed, some back to universities, some to other research institutions such as WestEd noted above and to NASA Ames. Others returned to the corporate sector or made their way newly into the corporate world to work in the emerging field of business anthropology or Ethnographic practice in corporations.

=== IRL Projects and Researchers (from Annual Reports) ===
Year	Project Topic	Funder	IRL research lead				
1988	MediaWorks Project: Learning through Multimedia Composing	Apple Advanced Technology Group	Roy Pea				
1988	Cognitive Processes in Understanding and Using Scientific Diagrams	NSF, Apple Computer	Roy Pea				
1989	VideoNoter: Situating learning with multimedia analysis of human activities	Apple Computer, ACOT	Roy Pea				
1992	Video Portfolios Project	Nat’l Brd Prof. Teacher Standards					
1992	Thinking Practices Symposium	Carnegie Corporation, New York	Jim Greeno				
1992	Synthesis Engineering Education Coalition	NSF, Stanford U./ Ctr for Design Research					
1993	Gate Airlines Project	American Airlines	Gitti Jordan				
1993	Instructional Design Environment	Apple, Motorola, NHI					
1993	Middle-School Math-through–Applications	NSF, Hearst Fndtn	Shelley Goldman				
1993	Fellowship program for Minorities	Carnegie Foundation					
1993	Environments for Knowledge Worker Productivity	Steelcase	Charlotte Linde				
1993	Work Practice and Design Project	Xerox Services	Gitte Jordan				
1993	T-Helper Project	NSF, Info, Robotics & Intelligent Systems	Bill Clancey				
1994	Learning and Work Design	Nynex Sci & Technology	Bill Clancey, Gitti Jordan				
1994	Learning, Identity and Diversity	Xerox Foundation	Penny Eckert, Etienne Wenger				
1994	Gender Restructuring in Pre-Adolescence	Spencer Foundation	Penny Eckert				
1994	Institutional Memory	Xerox Fndnt	Charlotte Linde				
1994	Core Competency Reconnaissance	Congruity, Xerox	Etienne Wenger, E. Solomon-Grey				
1994	Classroom Assessment for Math Learning	Hearst Fndtn, PacTell Fndtn, Telesis Fndtn	Shelley Goldman, Ray McDermott				
1994	Rethinking Distance Learning	Sun Microsystems	Chris Darrouzet, Helga Wild, Ted Kahn				
1994	Life of Engineering Teams	Sun Microsystems	Chris Darrouzet, Helga Wild				
1994	Understanding Productive work	Xerox Services, PARC	Gitte Jordan				
1994	Bilingual conversations in Mathematics classrooms	Spencer Foundation	Judit Moschkovich				
1994	Synthesis Project. Innovative Assessment for Engineering	NSF, Stanford U.	Charlotte Linde				
1994	Electronic Records Project	HMO, anonymous	Charlotte Linde				
1994	Learning Multimedia and Telecommunications	NSF, PacBell, Bay Area Multimedia Alliance	Ted Kahn				
1994	Research into the Reform of Education	NSF	Jim Greeno				
1994	Workplace as Learning Spaces: Work Practice and Design Project	Xerox Corporation, PARC	Gitte Jordan				
1995	Technology in Support of Flatter Organizations	Talegen Holdings, PARC	Gitte Jordan				
1995	Productivity Partnership	Member-sponsored	Ted Kahn, Jeff Kelly				
1995	Understanding Organizational Learning across Institutions	Insurance companies	Charlotte Linde				
1995	Innovation as Learning	Congruity, Raychem, National Semiconductors	Etienne Wenger	1995	Broad Alliance for Multimedia Technologies and Applications (BAMTA)	NASA Ames, multiple companies	Ted Kahn
1996	Alternative Officing in a Sales Office: Informal Learning & Space	Sun Microsystems	Chris Darrouzet & Helga Wild				
1996	Challenge 2000 Multimedia Project	US Dep. of Ed, SRI, Joint Venture Silicon Valley Network	Ted Kahn, Ralph Manak, Tina Syer				
1996	Classroom Assessment for Math Learning	Hearst Fndtn, NSF, Pacific Telesis Fndnt, anonymous donor	Shelley Goldman & Ray McDermott				
1996	Fifth Dimension Project: A Learning Community of After-School Clubs	Mellon Foundation	Jim Greeno, Ray McDermott, Mizuko Ito				
1996	Gender Re-Structuring in Preadolescence: Learning, Identity and Diversity	Spencer Foundation	Penny Eckert	1996	A Conversation for Learning for the 21st Century	AT&T Foundation, Institute for the New California	Ted Kahn
1997	Learning in and for Participation in Work & Society	US Dep. of Education (OERI)	Susan Stucky and Jim Greeno				
1997	Learning, Multimedia and Telecommunications	NASA, BAMTA member contributions	Ted Kahn				
1997	Learning Network Planning	AT&T Foundation	Shelley Goldman and Karen Cole				
1997	Mathematical Discourse in Bilingual Settings	NSF	Judit Moschkovich				
1997	Multimedia Makers, MediaWorks, DesignNet	NASA, PacBell, BAMTA	Ted Kahn				
1997	School-to-Career: Workplace Life skills	Connecticut Ctr for Ed'l and Training Technology	Shelley Goldman, Ted Kahn, Ray McDermott				
1997	Teacher Professional Development	AT&T Fndtn., NSF, Arthur Andersen & Co, San Mateo County Office of Education	Ralph Manak				
1997	Affordances of Remote Communication Technologies	Xerox PARC	Gitte Jordan				
1997	BRAHMS: Agent-based holistic modeling	Nynex Science & Technology Inc.	Bill Clancey				
1997	Workplace Assessment: New Sun Campus	Sun Microsystems	Chris Darrouzet & Helga Wild				
1997 and on	Broadening Access: Research for Diverse Network Communities	NSF	Charlotte Linde & Mizuko Ito				
1997	Building Environments for Learning and Innovation	HP Corporation	Helga Wild				
1997	Communities of Practice: Learning, Meaning and Identity	Xerox Fndtn	Etienne Wenger				
1997	Customer-driven arrival time	Xerox Corp.	Jack Whalen				
1997	Developing and Implementing Integrated Customer Services	Xerox Corp.	Marilyn Whalen				
1997	Enhancing Success of Xerox's Sales Representatives	Xerox Corp.	Melissa Cefkin				
1997	From Training to Learning: Demonstrating Innovation at Xerox	Xerox Corp.	Marilyn Whalen				
1997	Institutional Memory	Xerox Fndtn	Charlotte Linde				
1997	Insurance Agent Learning Project	Insurance Company	Chris Darrouzet & Charlotte Linde				
1997	Learning, Identity & Diversity	Xerox Fndntn	Penny Eckert, Etienne Wenger				
1997	Learning Strategy	Nynex Sci & Technology	Pat Sachs				
1997	Phased Interactive Learning	Xerox Corp.	Jack & Marilyn Whalen				
1997	RepTool Project: Building a Tool for the Learning Organization	Nynex Science & Technology	Gitte Jordan				
1997	Design Strategy for Learning & Innovation Environments	Steelcase Inc. and HP	Helga Wild				
1998	Primes	NSF	Angela Booker				
1998	Middle-School Math: A Curriculum that works	NSF	Shelley Goldman & Jennifer Knudsen				
1998	MMAP Implementation Project	U. of Missouri	Shelley Goldman & Jennifer Knudsen				
1998	Creating Assessment Systems	Bay Area School	Karen Cole				
1998	Challenge 2000 Multimedia Project	US Dep Education	Ralph Manak, Karen Cole				
1998	Research-based Website Design	P International	Karen Cole				
1998	New Hire Learning and Development: Xerox Sales	Xerox Corp.	Melissa Cefkin				
1998	Adapting Practice across Country and Cultural Boundaries	European financial group	Susan Stucky				
1998	Institute for Women & Technology	Xerox PARC	Penny Eckert				
1998	Managing Innovation in a large dispersed Organization	Insurance Co.	Charlotte Linde, Chris Darrouzet, Libby Bishop				
1998	Re-Introducing Mentoring and Learning on the job	Insurance Co.	Charlotte Linde, Chris Darrouzet, Libby Bishop				
1998	Training, Motivating and Managing the Independent Professional	Insurance Co.	Charlotte Linde, Chris Darrouzet				
1998	Work Practice Apprenticeship	Xerox Corp.	Pat Sachs				
1998	Integrative Study	US Dep. Education	Susan Stucky				
1998	Social Ecology Project	Steelcase Inc.	Helga Wild				
1998	Creating a Learning Strategy	VA	August Carbonella & Melissa Cefkin				
1998	Advanced Seminar in Learning, Technology and Design	Stanford U., School of Education	Shelley Goldman				
1998	CapitalWorks Developing a Learning Effectiveness Index	CapitalWorks, Centrobe, Cisco, IBM, Nortel Networks	Melissa Cefkin, Ted Kahn, Jeff Kelley,				
1998	Evaluation Framework for NASA's Outreach programs	NASA	Charlotte Linde				
1998	Biodiversity Education through Mountain Lake Rehabilitation	CA Academy of Sciences	Shelley Goldman				
1998	Learning to be Adolescent. Part of IRL's Learning, Identity & Diversity Initiative	IRL	Penny Eckert				
1998	Video Interactives for Teacher analysis and learning	NSF	Pam Briskman				
1999	PRIMES: Parents Rediscovering Math and Engaging Schools	NSF	Angela Booker				
1999	Revising Educational Strategy in a Major Computer Company	Anonymous	Chris Darrouzet				
1999	Intellectual Capital in a Global Financial Firm	Zurich Financial	Susan Stucky				
1999	Xerox Work Practice – Building Xerox's Expertise	Xerox Corp.	Melissa Cefkin				

== Bibliography ==
- Allen, C. L., Linde, C., Pea, R. D., de Vet, J., & de Vogel, R. (1992). The Picasso Project on Multimedia Communications: Final Report. Technical Report, Institute for Research on Learning. Palo Alto, CA (139pp)
- Clancey, W. J., Sachs, P., Sierhuis, M., and van Hoof, R. 1998. Brahms: Simulating practice for work systems design, Int. J. Computer-Human Studies, 49, 831-865.
- Clancey, W. J. 1997. Situated Cognition: On Human Knowledge and Computer Representations. New York: Cambridge University Press.
- Clancey, W. J. 2006. Observation of work practices in natural settings. In A. Ericsson, N. Charness, P. Feltovich, and R. Hoffman (eds.), Cambridge Handbook on Expertise and Expert Performance. New York: Cambridge University Press, pp. 127–145.
- Clancey, W. J. 2008. Scientific antecedents of situated cognition. In P. Robbins and M. Aydede (eds.), Cambridge Handbook of Situated Cognition. New York: Cambridge University Press, pp. 11–34.
- Mills, M. I., & Pea, R. D. (1989). Mind and media in dialog: Issues in multimedia composition. In K. Hooper & S. Ambron (Eds.), Full-Spectrum Learning (pp. 14-37). Cupertino, CA: Apple Computer, Inc.
- Pea, R.D. (1991, July). Learning through multimedia. IEEE Computer Graphics and Applications, 11(4), 58-66.
- Pea, R. D. (1992). Augmenting the discourse of learning with computer-based learning environments. In E. de Corte, M. Linn, & L. Verschaffel (Eds.), Computer-based learning environments and problem-solving (NATO Series, subseries F: Computer and System Sciences). New York: Springer-Verlag GmbH (pp. 313-343).
- Pea, R. D. (1993). Practices of distributed intelligence and designs for education. In G. Salomon (Ed.). Distributed cognitions (pp. 47-87). New York: Cambridge University Press. [First appeared as IRL Technical Report].
- Pea, R. D. (1993). Learning scientific concepts through material and social activities: Conversational analysis meets conceptual change. Educational Psychologist, 28(3), 265-277.
- Pea, R. D. (1994). Seeing what we build together: Distributed multimedia learning environments for transformative communications. Journal of the Learning Sciences, 3(3), 285-299.
- Pea, R.D., Boyle, E., and de Vogel, R. (1990). Design spaces for multimedia composing tools. In B. Bowen (Ed.), Designing for learning (pp. 37-42). Cupertino, CA: Apple Computer Press.
- Roschelle, J., Pea, R. D., & Sipusic, M. (1989, April). Design of a tool for video analysis. Proceedings of ACM/SIGCHI Workshop on Video as a Research and Design Tool, MIT, Cambridge MA.
- Roschelle, J., Pea, R. D., & Trigg, R. (1990). VideoNoter: A tool for exploratory video analysis. Institute for Research on Learning, Technical Report No. 17. Palo Alto, CA.
- Stucky, S., 1992. Technology in support of organizational learning. In C. Zucchermaglio, Bagnara, S., and Stucky, S. (eds.), Organizational Learning and Technological Change. NATO Advanced Science Institute Series. Springer -Verlag GmbH & KG, Berlin.
- Stucky, S., Cefkin, M., Rankin, Y., Shaw B., and J. Thomas. 2011. Dynamics of Value Co-Creation in Complex IT Engagements. Information systems and e-business management, 9.
- Stucky, S., Kieliszewski, C. and L.Anderson. 2014. A Case Study: Designing the client experience for Discovery using Big Data. In Ahram, T., Karwowski, W., and T. Marek (eds.), Proceedings of the 5th International Conference on Applied Human Factors and Ergonomics AHFE 2014, Kraków, Poland July 19–23.
