= Online Educa Berlin =

Online Educa Berlin (OEB) is an annual international conference on technology-supported learning and training (e-learning) launched in Berlin, Germany in 1995.

Since its inception, OEB conferences have taken place in Berlin’s central district Mitte in November or early December of each year. The first OEB was hosted at the Berlin Congress Center (bcc); it then moved to the Hotel InterContinental Berlin in 1996 where it has taken place for subsequent years, apart from 2020, when it was organised as a virtual event.

The conferences were supported by the German Federal Minister of Education and Research and the European Commission (Directorate-General for Education and Culture). Each year the conference attracts around 2,500 learning and training professionals from over 70 countries.

Delegates are high-level decision-makers from the education, business and government sectors, making OEB an important networking venue for experts, practitioners and newcomers of e-learning and distance education alike. Training specialists hold lectures and seminars and lead discussions and workshops in which current trends and the latest developments are introduced. The event is held entirely in English and is accompanied by an exhibition at which international e-learning suppliers present their latest products and services.
