= International Society of the Learning Sciences =

The International Society of the Learning Sciences is a professional society dedicated to the interdisciplinary empirical investigation of learning as it exists in real-world settings and how learning may be facilitated both with and without technology. Learning sciences research explores the nature and conditions of learning as it occurs in educational environments, broadly construed.

The field draws upon multiple theoretical perspectives and research paradigms to understand the complexities associated with human learning, cognition, and development. Researchers in the interdisciplinary field of learning sciences, born during the 1990s, study learning as it happens in real-life situations and how to better facilitate learning in designed environments – in school, online, in the workplace, at home, and in informal environments. Learning sciences research is guided by constructivist, social-constructivist, socio-cognitive, and socio-cultural theories of learning.

The society is widely interdisciplinary and includes members from cognitive science, educational psychology, computer science, anthropology, sociology, information sciences, neurosciences, education, design studies, instructional design, and other fields; it is related to but distinct from the field of educational technology. Currently the society includes members from six continents and hosts conferences globally.

The International Society of the Learning Sciences, incorporated as a non-profit professional society in September, 2002, unites the traditions started by the Journal of the Learning Sciences, the International Conferences of the Learning Sciences (ICLS), and the Computer-Supported Collaborative Learning Conference (CSCL) and offers publications, conferences, and educational programs to the community of researchers and practitioners who use cognitive, socio-cognitive, and socio-cultural approaches to studying learning in real-world situations and designing environments, software, materials, and other innovations that promote deep and lasting learning. In 2004, the ISLS-sponsored Journal of the Learning Sciences was listed as the highest-impact journal in education and educational research by the ISI Journal Citation Reports Social Science Edition. In the 2009 edition, the ISLS-sponsored International Journal of Computer-Supported Collaborative Learning was ranked second highest impact journal in education and educational research.

== Past presidents ==
Past presidents include notable scholars from the field, including three members of the US National Academy of Education and five Fellows of the American Educational Research Association.

- 2002 Christopher Hoadley, University at Buffalo, US
- 2003 Pierre Dillenbourg, EPFL, Switzerland
- 2004 Roy Pea, Stanford University, US
- 2005 Claire O'Malley, Durham University, UK
- 2006 Yasmin Kafai, University of Pennsylvania, US
- 2007 Naomi Miyake, University of Tokyo, Japan (deceased)
- 2008 Marcia Linn, University of California Berkeley, US
- 2009 Iris Tabak, Ben Gurion University of the Negev, Israel
- 2010 Paul Kirschner, Open University of the Netherlands, Netherlands
- 2011 Susan R. Goldman, University of Illinois Chicago, US
- 2012 Frank Fischer, LMU Munich, Germany
- 2013 Cindy Hmelo-Silver, Indiana University, US
- 2014 Eleni Kyza, Cyprus University of Technology, Cyprus
- 2015 Carolyn Rose, Carnegie Mellon University, US
- 2016 Nikol Rummel, Ruhr Universität Bochum, Germany
- 2017 Bill Sandoval, University of California Los Angeles, US
- 2019 Joe Polman, University of Colorado Boulder, US
- 2020 Heisawn Jeong, Hallym University, Republic of Korea
- 2021 Victor R. Lee, Stanford University, US
- 2022 Oskar Lindwall, University of Gothenburg, Sweden
- 2023 Joshua Danish, Indiana University, US
