= Journal of the Learning Sciences =

- Discipline: Education
- Language: English
- Edited by: Susan Jurow, Jianwei Zhang

Publication details
- History: 1991-present
- Publisher: Routledge
- Frequency: 5/year
- Impact factor: 5.171 (2020)

Standard abbreviations
- ISO 4: J. Learn. Sci.

Indexing
- CODEN: JLSBE3
- ISSN: 1050-8406 (print); 1532-7809 (web)
- LCCN: 91641725
- OCLC no.: 45007206

Links
- Journal homepage; Online access; Online archive

The Journal of the Learning Sciences is a peer-reviewed academic journal covering research on education and learning as theoretical and design sciences. It is one of two official publications of the International Society of the Learning Sciences, and is published by Routledge. The current editors-in-chief are Leema Berland and Erica Halverson (both from the University of Wisconsin-Madison). Previous editors-in-chief include Susan Jurow, Jianwei Zhang, Susan A. Yoon, Jan van Aalst, Iris Tabak, Josh Radinsky, Cindy Hmelo-Silver, Yasmin Kafai, and founding editor emeritus Janet L. Kolodner.

== Abstracting and indexing ==
According to the Journal Citation Reports, the journal has a 2020 impact factor of 5.171.
