= Attfield =

Attfield is a surname. Notable people with the surname include:

- George Attfield (1826–1925), English cricketer
- Henry Attfield (1756–c. 1829), English cricketer
- Jeremy Attfield (born 1972), English cricketer
- Judith (Judy) Attfield (1937–2006), British design historian
- Paul Attfield (born 1962), British academic
- Robin Attfield, British academic
- Roger Attfield (born 1939), Canadian thoroughbred trainer
- William Attfield (1823–1876), English cricketer
