= East of England cricket team =

English regional cricket team

An East of England cricket team (known simply as "East") was organised on an ad hoc basis at intervals between 1874 and 1948. CricketArchive lists ten East matches in total, five of them rated first-class. Four first-class matches were against West and one, in 1927, against the touring New Zealanders.

== Summary of first-class matches ==
5 September 1892 — East v West at United Services Recreation Ground, Portsmouth. West won by 48 runs.

West 186 (John Shilton 6/63) and 163 (Hornsby 8/63); East 159 and 142.
Note : Sammy Woods (West) took thirteen wickets in the match with 7/56 and 6/53

3 September 1894 — East v West at United Services Recreation Ground, Portsmouth. Match drawn.

East 305 and 129/6d; West 272 and 71/0.

20 June 1910 — West v East at Cardiff Arms Park. West won by 4 wickets.

East 295 (Freeman 94) and 112; West 199 and 210/6.

9 July 1927 — East v New Zealanders at Harecroft Road, Wisbech. New Zealanders won by 8 wickets.

East 170 and 145; NZ 243 (Hazelton 5/68) and 76/2.

8 September 1948 — East v West at Leyland Motors Ground, Kingston-upon-Thames. East won by 223 runs.

East 392 (Pawson 128*) and 304-8d (Todd 107); West 294 (Sims 3/82) and 179 (Sims 10/90).
Note : Jim Sims (East) took thirteen wickets in the match, including the rare feat of ten wickets in an innings with his 10/90 in the second innings.

== Players ==
The following 53 players represented East in first-class matches. Two players, John Hornsby and Charles Wright made two appearances, the rest one apiece.

- Herbert Bainbridge (1892)
- Tom Barling (1948)
- Alex Bowell (1910)
- George Brann (1892)
- Syd Brown (1948)
- Claude Buckenham (1910)
- Frederick Burton (1927)
- George Carnegie-Brown (1927)
- Richard Carter (1927)
- Reginald Covill (1927)
- Dickie Dodds (1948)
- Ray Dovey (1948)
- Francis Ford (1892)
- Ray Frearson (1927)
- John Freeman (1910)
- Laurie Gray (1948)
- Arthur Grimsdell (1927)
- Wyndham Hazelton (1927)
- Alec Hearne (1894)
- J. T. Hearne (1894)
- Norman Holloway (1927)
- John Hornsby (1892/94)
- Leonard Irvine (1927)
- Alec Kennedy (1910)
- Robert Slade Lucas (1894)
- Eustace Malden (1892)
- Frederick Martin (1894)
- Charlie McGahey (1910)
- Arthur McIntyre (1948)
- Phil Mead (1910)
- Walter Mead (1910)
- Jack Mee (1892)
- Billy Newham (1892)
- Tony Pawson (1948)
- Percy Perrin (1910)
- Walter Read (1894)
- Bill Reeves (1910)
- John Robinson (1894)
- John Searby (1927)
- John Shilton (1892)
- Jim Sims (1948)
- Ray Smith (1948)
- Peter Smith (1948)
- Andrew Stoddart (1894)
- Jimmy Stone (1910)
- Charles Titchmarsh (1927)
- Leslie Todd (1948)
- Bert Tremlin (1910)
- George Ulyett (1892)
- George Vernon (1892)
- Gerry Weigall (1894)
- Charles Wright (1892/94)
- Walter Wright (1894)

== See also ==
- West of England cricket team
- North v South
