= Jochen Claussen-Finks =

German designer, photographer and filmmaker

- Occupations: Designer, photographer, filmmaker
- Awards: IF Design Award Hannover 1969

Jochen Claussen-Finks is a German designer, photographer and filmmaker.

== Biography ==
Claussen-Finks studied in the Department of Product Design, of which he was also the last elected student representative. He graduated with his research thesis "Individual Preference – Subjective Esthetic Behavior"("Subjektiv Ästhetisches Verhalten"). Participants of the study had to sort multiple kinds of natural stones into individual categories of their own likes and dislikes and also comment about their emotional impact in this process. Claussen-Finks was convinced there are individual types of "taste-groups" with similar preferences different from others. This category of individual taste, emotion and liking was extending the hfg´s focus on ergonomics and geometrical forms.

A form study by Claussen-Finks as a sliced model was selected to represent the hfg within the German Pavilion at the Montreal World Expo 1967. A project group at the hfg under Ohl and Kapitzki was developing this German pavilion.

As a student of the Ulm School of Design (Hochschule für Gestaltung hfg Ulm), Jochen Claussen-Finks was influenced by hfg members such as Gui Bonsiepe, Abraham Moles, Max Bill, Walter Zeischegg, Alexander Kluge and Kohei Sugiura. Gui Bonsiepe invited Claussen-Finks in 1967 to join the team of him an Franco Clivio for designing a presentation system for Milan-based department store La Rinascente, where Tomás Maldonado (second hfg rector after Max Bill) was the director of Corporate Image from 1967 to 1969. Still a student, Jochen Claussen-Finks began designing projects for IBM (color system for a production line), Daniel Peres (scissors), Perthen (measurement device for surfaces, IF Design Award) and Olympia Baugesellschaft mbH München (seats) where he worked for Hans (Nick) Roericht who was in the 1972 Summer Olympics design team of Otl Aicher (founder of the hfg and director of the visual conception commission of the Olympics).

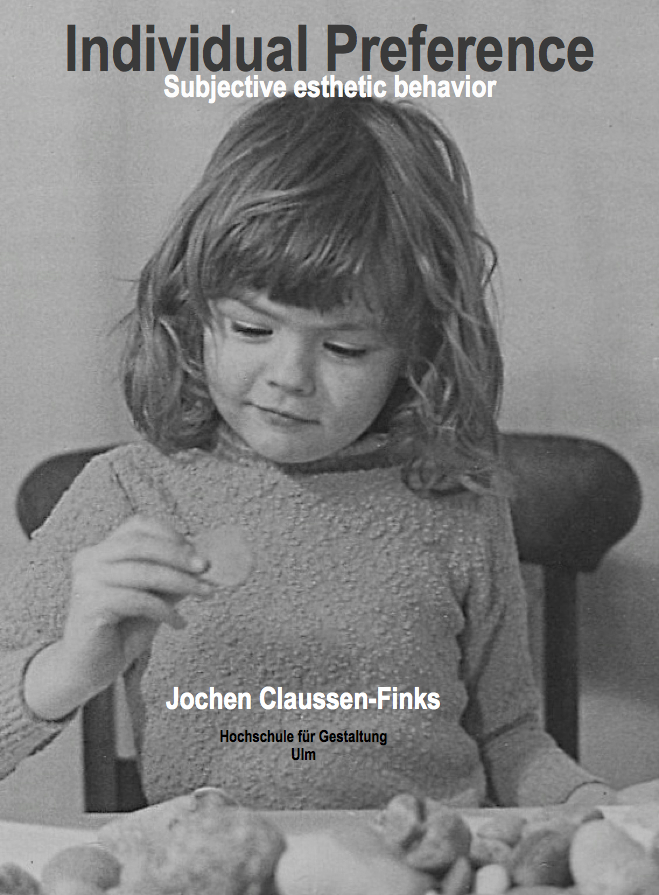
Research work on Individual Preference - Subjective Esthetic Behavior ..started in 1968 at the hfg ..finished in 1971

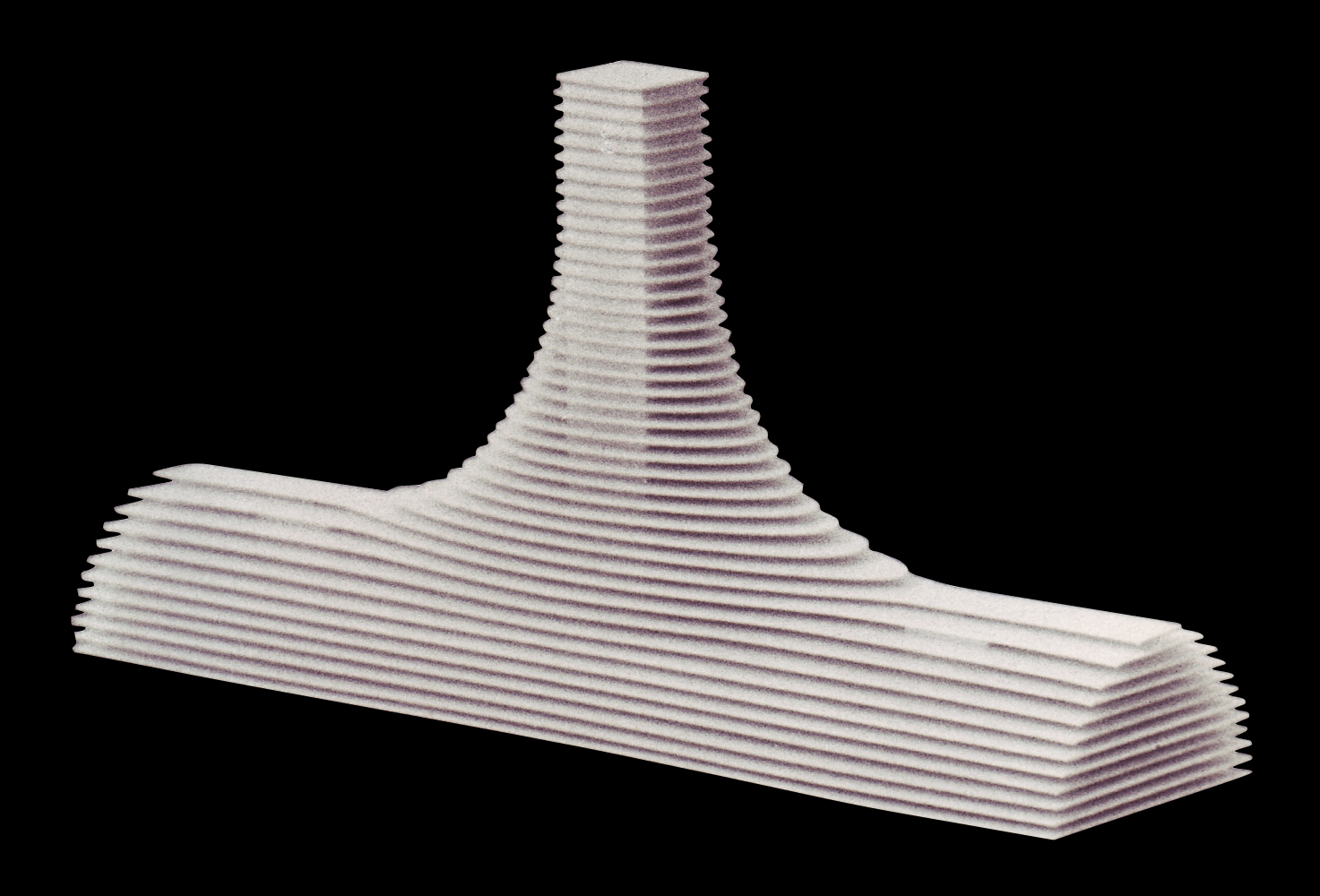
Form study 1967, selected to represent the hfg in the German Pavilion at the Montreal World Expo 1967

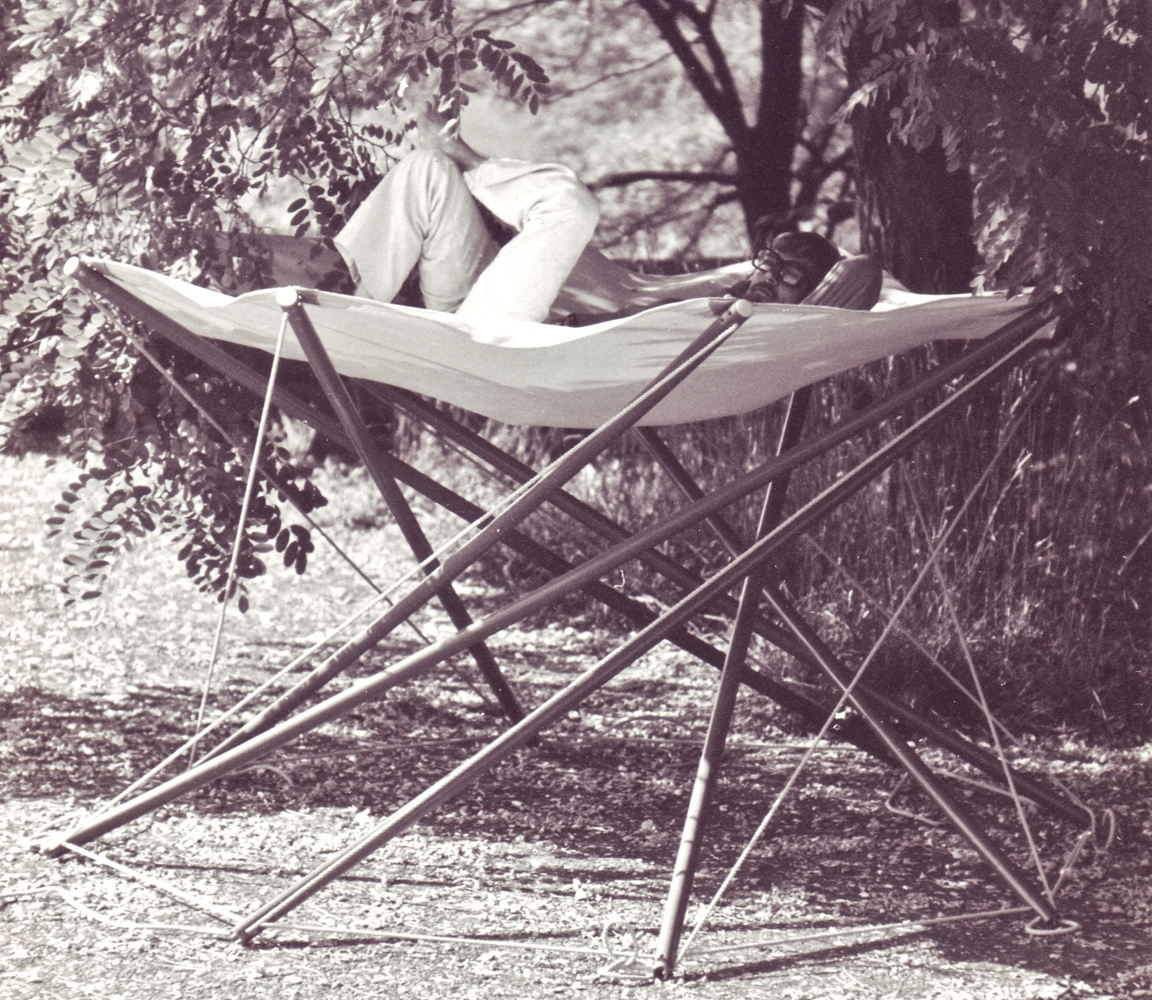
Tensegrity Structure on the terrace of the hfg in 1970 ..following a study done in 1967

== Design and experiment ==
Claussen-Finks received the IF Product Design Award Hannover 1969.

Experimental Design of Tensegrity structure following a hfg study from 1967. Tensegrity structures, as defined by Buckminster Fuller tubes do not touch each other and are connected by ropes. This elastic structure gives a relaxed feeling to lie on and softens every movement. A second prototype was designed to swim on water and offer a platform above the waves.

Sliding Calendar invention in 1984. The conceptual idea of the calendar was to create something thin and intelligent smooth to use with one hand. The desired month is adjusted in a small window on the front from a code system on the back. The first company to use the calendar as a giveaway was IBM to promote the introduction of the Personal Computer with Charlie Chaplin as a cover print in Germany. The calendar works without a battery. After the white version, Claussen-Finks developed a relief surface for a black version of the calendar giving the impression of an electronic device. The permanent sliding calendar was invented by Claussen-Finks 24 years before Apple presented its first iPhone in 2008, where sliding on the screen with the finger appeared in an electronic consumer product for the first time.

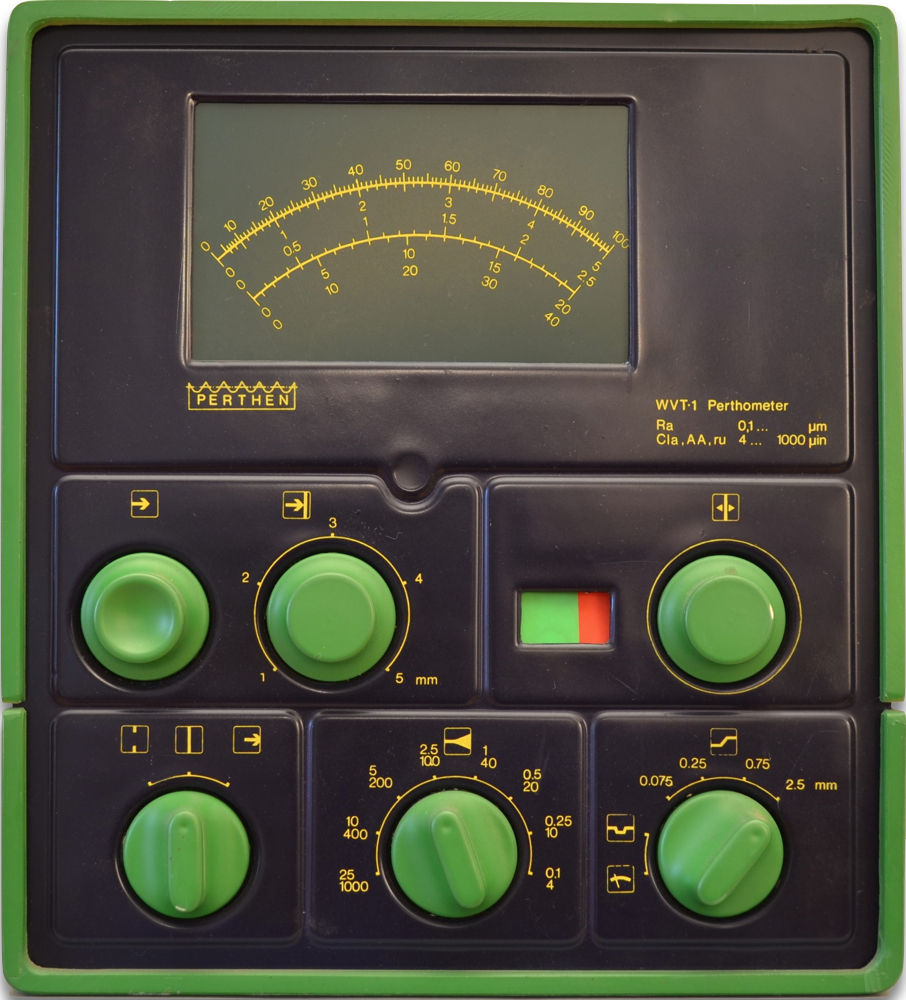
IF Product Design Award 1969 of the Hannover Fair ..new design invention of buttons ..new pictograms and colors

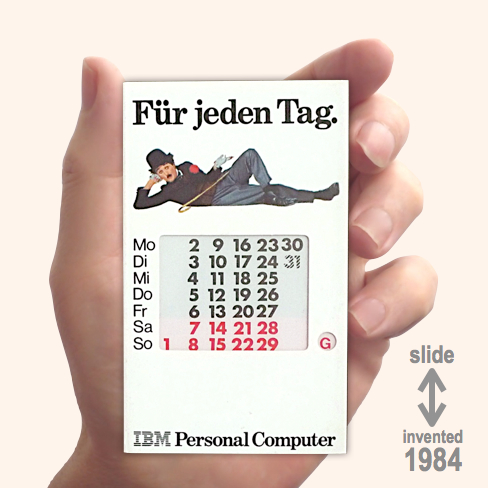
Sliding Calendar Invention 1984 ..IBM promoted the introduction of the Personal Computer in Germany with this calendar ..adjustable with a sliding interface 24 years before Apple`s iPhone

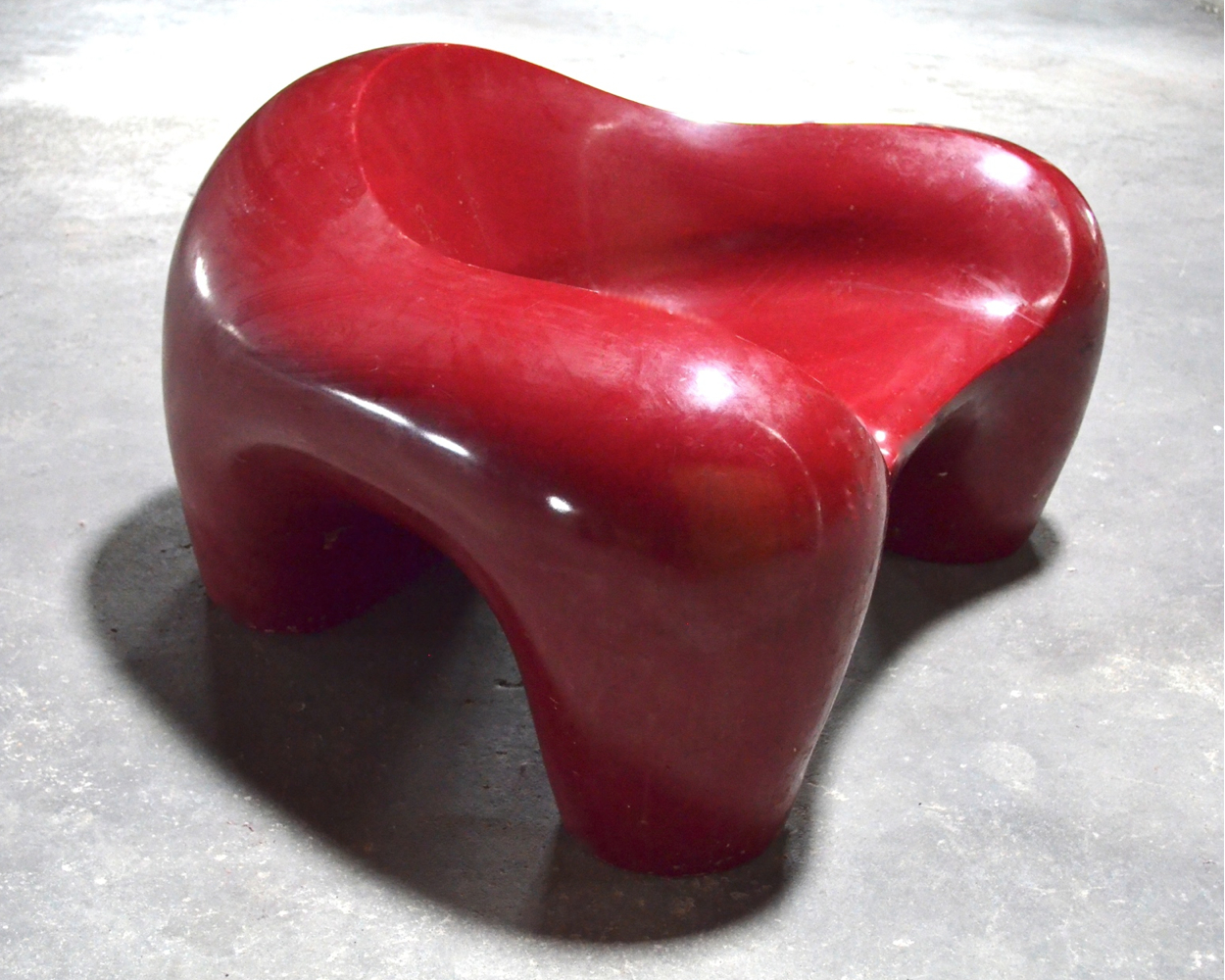
Prototype of a fiberglass armchair ..shaped from a block of foam at the hfg plaster workshop 1971

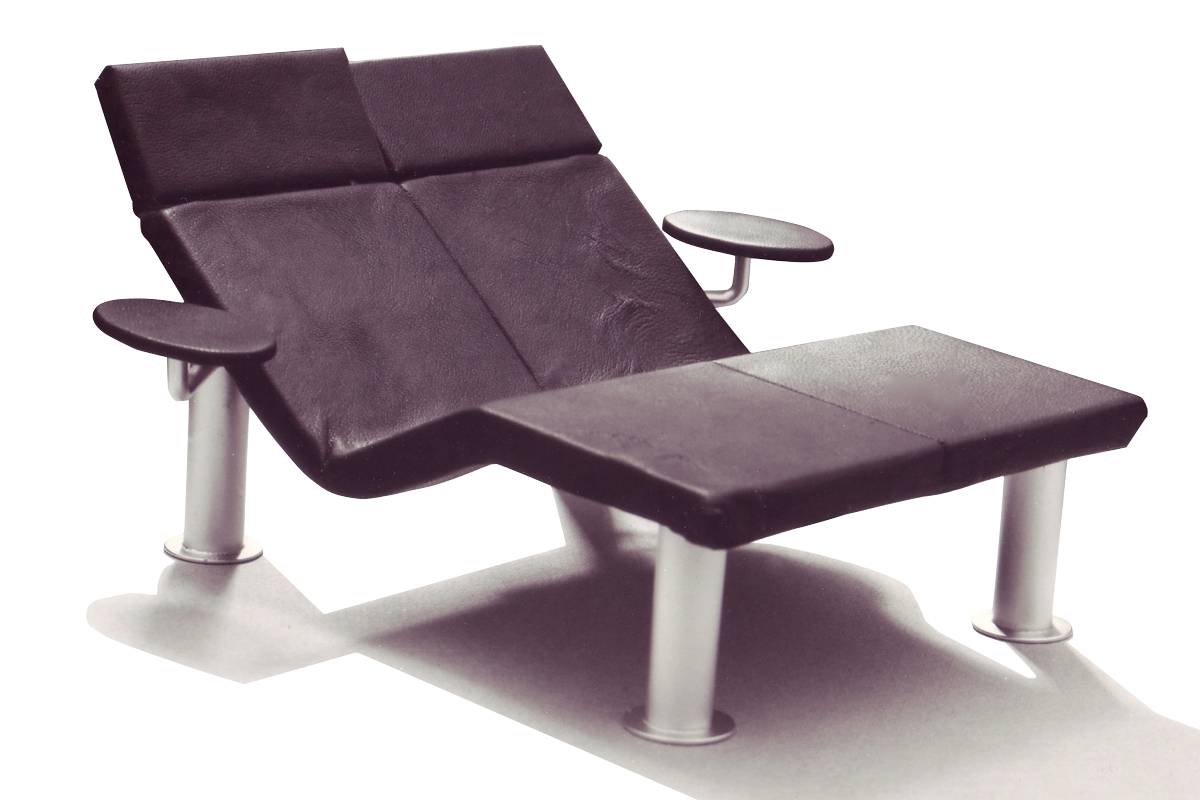
Relax for Two 1978 ..with adjustable tables ..after a research by Claussen-Finks for Interlübke showed the importance of relaxing in private living

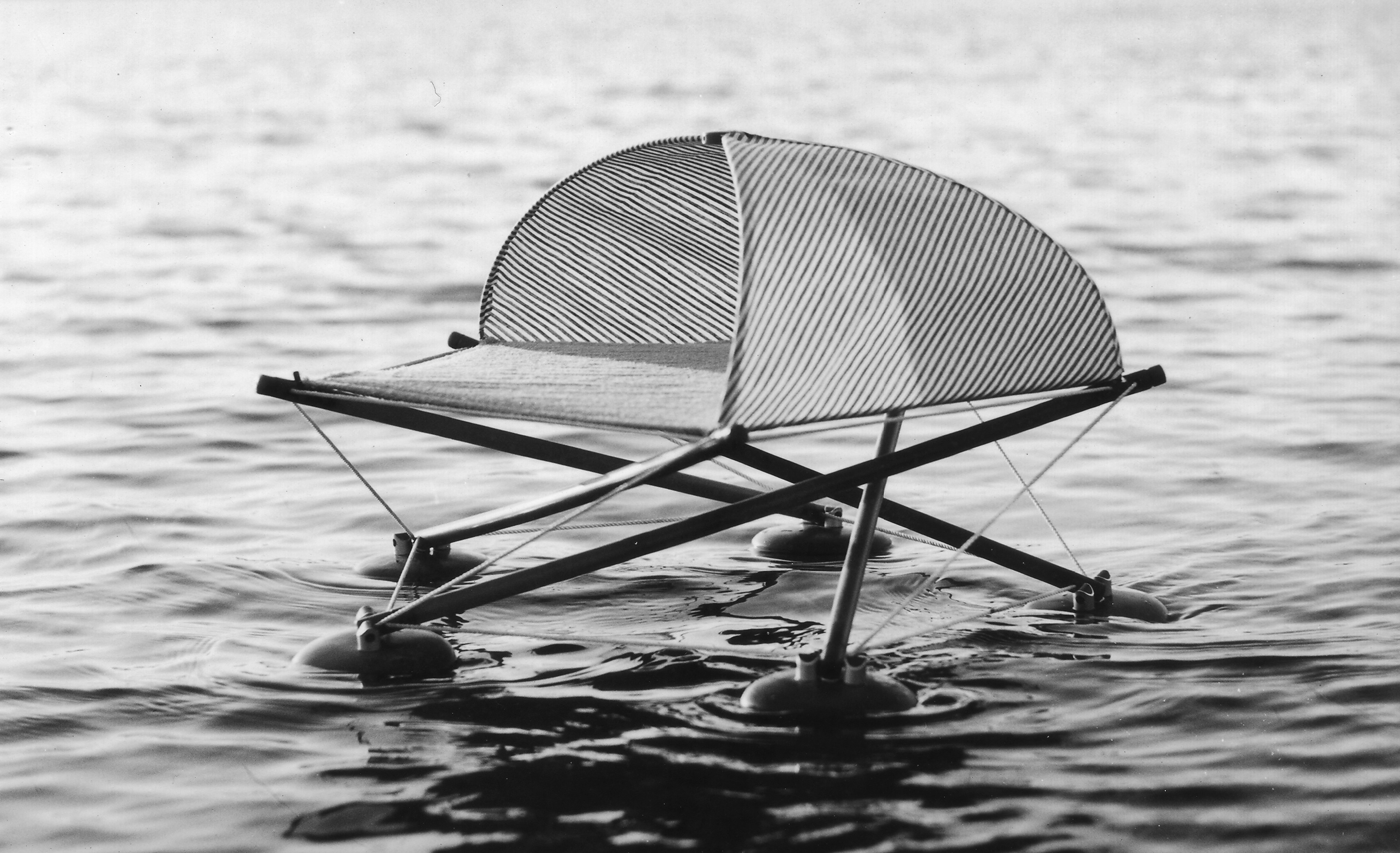
Swimming Tensegrity Structure 1972 ..following models from 1967 and 70

== Research ==
Claussen-Finks made analytical research on trade fair impact and brand relation based on individual video interviews for IBM, Daimler, BMW, Apple, Siemens, Nixdorf, Sun Microsystems, Sony, Deutsche Telekom and others. The results are used to understand the customer, for internal video communication, training and new dialog concepts. Research on the interaction of human dialog and furniture in trade fair environments led to Biological Concepting. One research project was titled "The elementary structures of well-being". Research on "Changing World News" is describing the changing face of the world in ultra-short samples of text and images with reference articles for deeper understanding. Subjects can be rising urban population, new use of energy like flying around the world on solar power, digital impact on everyone's life and global businesses, or the hype of the art market. Changing World News, started in 2010, can be seen as "Knowledge News for Inspiration", a dictionary of change and challenges.

== Artistic work ==
In 1972, Solo Exhibition of Wall Sculptures "Plastische Bilder"

In 1978, Solo Exhibition of Photographs "Orte ohne Zeit" (Places without Time) at Galerie Cuenca in Ulm. The exhibition marks an important moment in the history of the Ulm art scene as it was the very first exhibition of photographs in the city of Ulm, organized by gallerist Carlos Cuenca-Ramirez. Claussen-Finks idea was that his blurred images in black and white, taken with a Pentax 6x7, ask the viewers mind to uncover the world behind the image. The exhibition showed silver prints on paper and framed photo canvas. In the 1980s and 1990s, Jochen Claussen-Finks traveled extensively to Hydra, Greece, and India, where he continued to photograph and make film recordings. He takes on the philosophy of the "Places without Time" series in his most recent work of pigment prints on canvas "Distant Views", started in 2014. Through a special technique, he again creates blurred images of which the motives date back to his journeys to Hydra and India. "Distant Views" images submit a feeling of their subjects without giving details, following the tradition of Pictorialism, like he did with his earlier work "Places without Time" from 1978. Claussen-Finks believes that in a time of image consumption, pictures have to be re-individualized through the viewers mind and the collaboration of his imagination.

Claussen-Finks' works and photographs can be found in private collections in Germany.

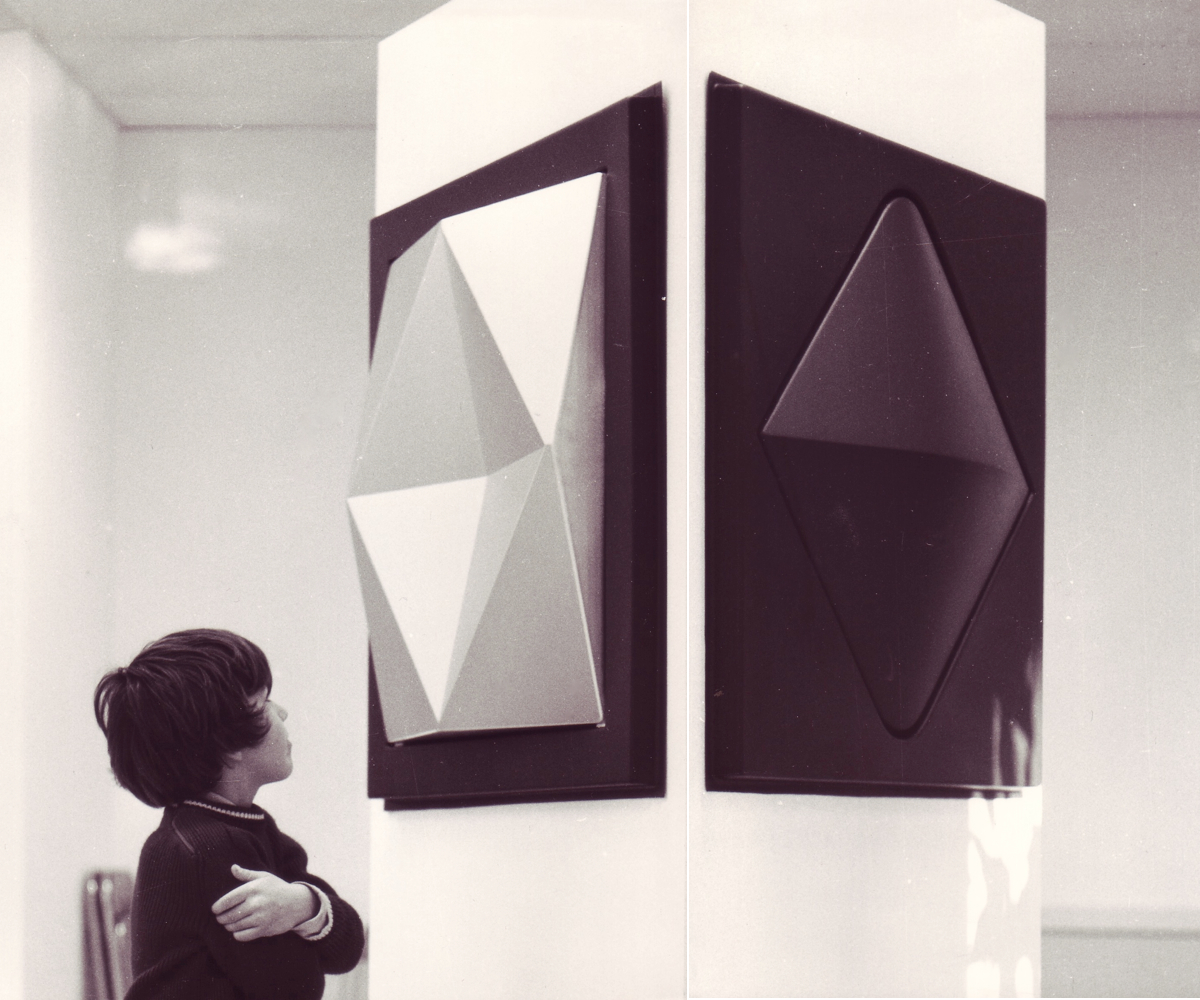
Exhibition of Wall Sculptures 1972

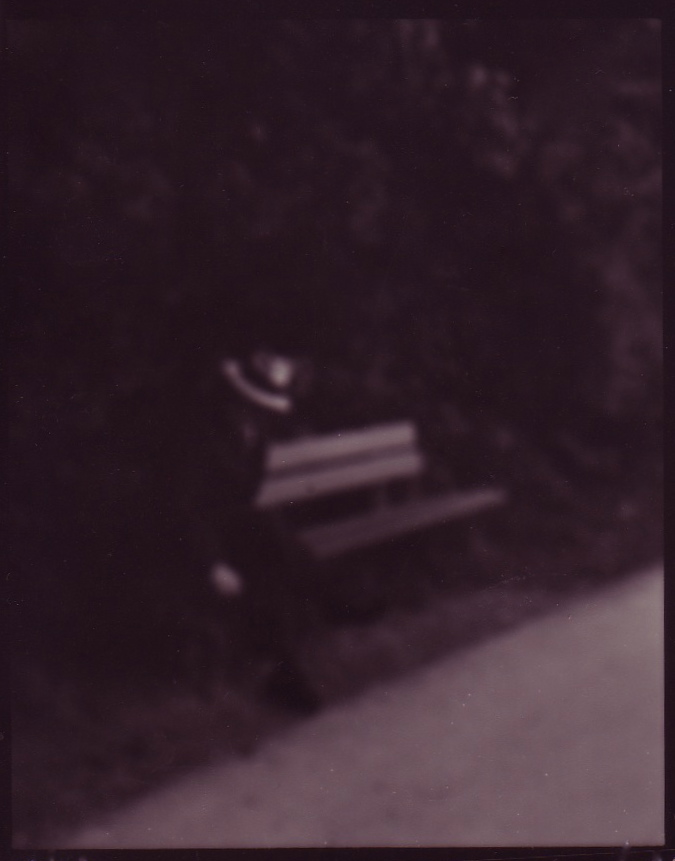
"The Afternoon" from the photo exhibition "Places without Time", 1978. Silver print on canvas

== hfg Ulm history – The School of Ideas ==
In October 1982 Claussen-Finks made film recordings on his own initiative in the hfg building when former members came together 14 years after its forced ending. Statements captured in the film, and his own experience, inspired Claussen-Finks for a future school following the hfg, a school focused on students interests and their activities, surrounded by inspiring information environment.

In December 1989, Jochen Claussen-Finks was invited to the Industrial Design Centre IDC of the Indian Institute of Technology IIT Bombay to show for the first time his film "Weltoffenheit, Freiheit und schlichte Schönheit" about the history of the Ulm School of Design. The film was screened at the "Ulm and after" event and includes interviews with the school's architect Max Bill and former professors Abraham Moles, Harry Pross, Tomás Maldonado, Klaus Krippendorff. The title "Weltoffenheit, Freiheit und schlichte Schönheit" (Cosmopolitanism, freedom and simple beauty) is inspired by the original idea of the school's concept formulated by Inge Scholl. At the IDC, Claussen-Finks proposed in a speech the future vision of how a "School of Ideas" could look like, anticipating new education concepts.

The Concept Ulm Today – A School of Ideas

"In the process of industrialized civilization now it seems, that the technical products we created just within one lifetime, they are taking over the essential human qualities and leave behind reduced individuals with a low level of interaction and without the rich expression we once had. The repeating reflexes of daily business life are dazing personal movements. The biological program written deeply into human beings through a process of millions of generations of our existence on earth is not any more the propulsion of our activities. We lost our inner ear to listen to the old guiding tune coming from inside. Time and speed take the place of essential living qualities. Our life on earth is endangered. How should education be like facing this situation in a period of rapid changes? Is it possible at all to educate for established professions? A "School of Ideas" seeing life in complete based on a rich spectrum of information with the assistance of all modern communication techniques would create concepts, ideas and visions to influence the process of civilization to put together again the broken pieces of life on earth."

Abstract of the speech by Jochen Claussen-Finks at IDC Bombay, "Ulm and after", 1989

For two weeks after the film screening, in January 1990, Claussen-Finks directed seminar sessions with the IDC students to work out concepts for a "School of Ideas" based on students interests, seeing themselves like a company, with no money but with ideas. In a poster he visualized for the first time a "School of Ideas – Concept for Interaction" using a photograph with a barefoot Indian man reading a newspaper – symbolizing the power of the mind. The photo was taken by Phani Tetali, then student at the IDC, now associate professor. The poster and idea are exhibited in 2018 at the China Design Museum in Hangzhou, China, on the occasion of the 100th anniversary of the Bauhaus as part of the international travelling exhibition "bauhaus imaginista".

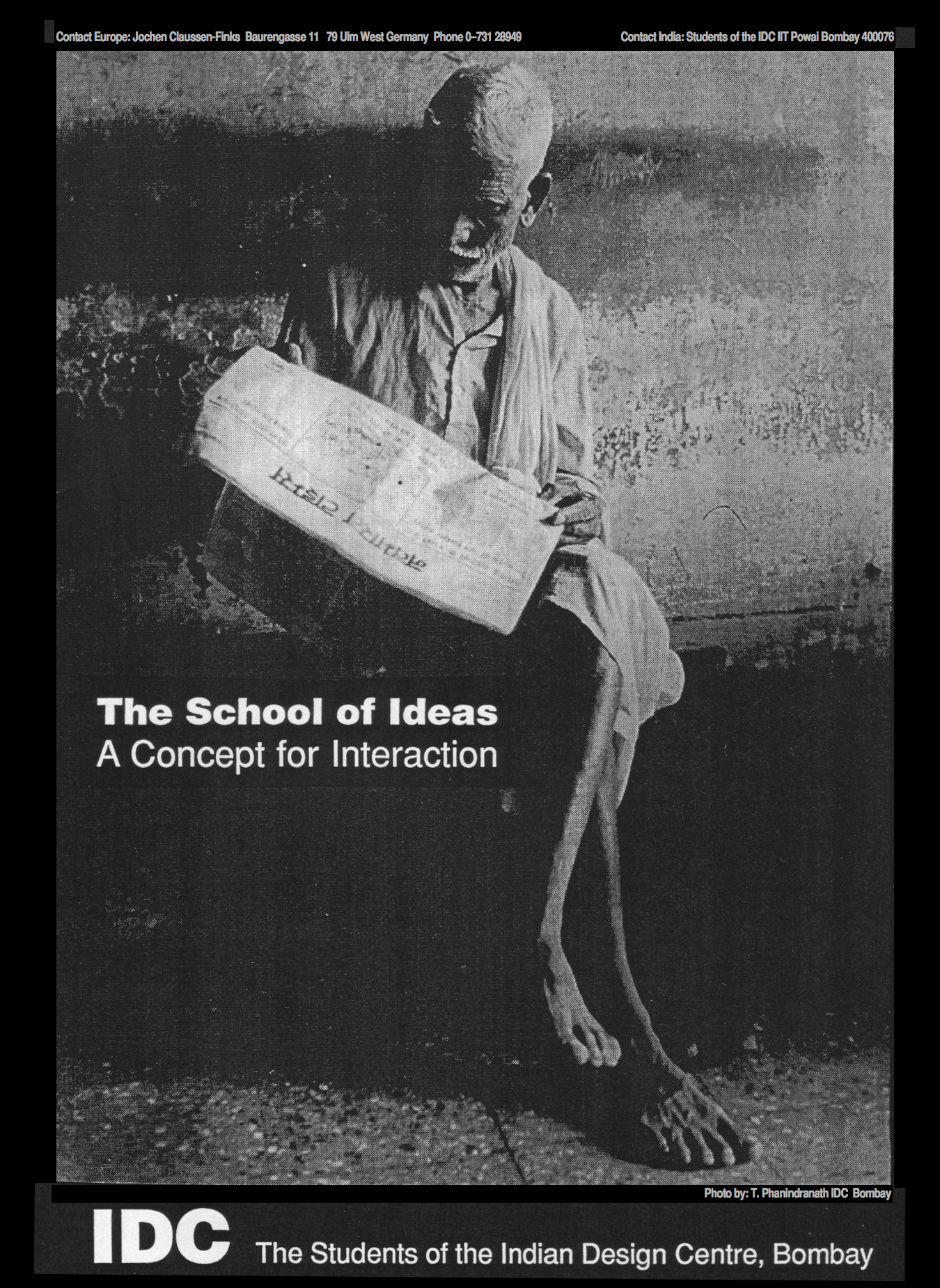
First visualization for a School of Ideas after the film premiere of the hfg documentary in Bombay and a seminar with students of the IDC in 1989–90

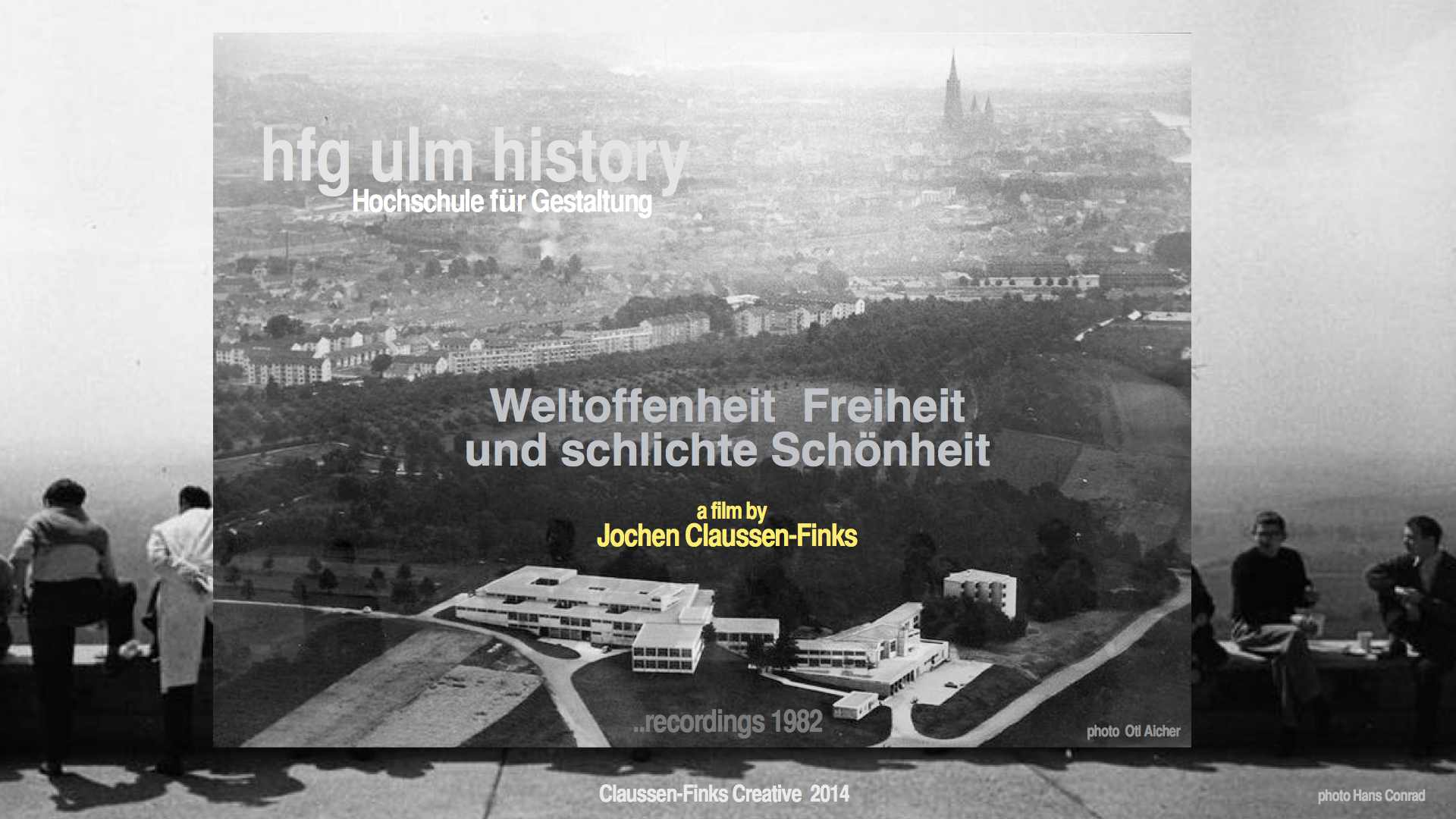
Film trailer "hfg ulm history" 2014 with unpublished recordings 1982 about the Hochschule für Gestaltung, the legendary Design School following the Bauhaus

== Personal life ==
Jochen Claussen-Finks was born in Neumünster, Schleswig-Holstein, Germany. His father Johannes Claussen-Finks studied fabric business. His mother Herta Claussen-Finks (née Nürnberg) was a fashion designer and had her own studio in Hamburg in the early 1930s where she was friends with the famous Herz family, Max Herz, who then founded Tchibo, and his three sisters Lola, Hanna and Lilli. She lived with Lola Herz and her husband John von Essen while maintaining her own studio designing mainly for the Herz family and its "ladies club". She later had a second studio in Neumünster. Claussen-Finks has one younger brother.

Jochen Claussen-Finks is a relative of the painter, sculptor and graphic artist Kurt Claussen-Finks (1913–1985).
