= Sydney Falding =

English cricketer

Personal information
- Full name: Sydney Wheatley Falding
- Born: 5 May 1891; Kirkstall, Yorkshire, England
- Died: 7 November 1959 (aged 68); Leeds, Yorkshire, England
- Batting: Left-handed
- Bowling: Left-arm fast-medium

Domestic team information
- Years: Team
- 1927: West of England
- 1925–1932: Devon
- 1921: Northamptonshire
- 1914: Lincolnshire

Career statistics
Competition	First-class
Matches	2
Runs scored	8
Batting average	2.66
100s/50s	–/–
Top score	8
Balls bowled	240
Wickets	3
Bowling average	56.00
5 wickets in innings	–
10 wickets in match	–
Best bowling	2/49
Catches/stumpings	–/–
- Source: Cricinfo, 20 March 2011

Sydney Wheatley Falding (5 May 1891 – 7 November 1959) was an English cricketer. Falding was a left-handed batsman who bowled left-arm fast-medium. He was born in Kirkstall, Yorkshire.

Falding made his debut in county cricket for Lincolnshire in the 1914 Minor Counties Championship, in which played two matches against Suffolk and Cambridgeshire. Following the First World War, Falding made a single first-class appearance for Northamptonshire against the touring Australians. The Australians scored a mammoth 621 in their first-innings, with Falding taking only the wicket of Warwick Armstrong for the cost of 119 runs. He reappeared in county cricket in 1925, playing for Devon in the Minor Counties Championship. From 1925 to 1932, he played 80 matches for Devon. He scored 3,137 runs for Devon at a batting average of 25.29, including several centuries and high score of 162 against Berkshire in 1926. With the ball he took 176 wickets at a bowling average of 18.49. In 1927, he played his final first-class match for the West of England against the touring New Zealanders at the County Ground, Exeter. He took two wickets in the match, those of New Zealand captain Tom Lowry and Ces Dacre.

He died in Leeds, Yorkshire on 7 November 1959.
