= West of England cricket team =

A West of England cricket team (known simply as "West") was organised on an ad hoc basis at intervals between 1844 and 1948. CricketArchive lists nine first-class matches and one minor match in 1874 against Marylebone Cricket Club (MCC). In addition, West teams were involved in numerous minor events in the 1944 and 1945 seasons, when matches were frequently raised for charitable purposes during World War II. Four first-class matches were played by West against MCC, one against East and one, in 1927, against the touring New Zealanders.

== Summary of first-class matches ==
24 June 1844 — Marylebone Cricket Club v West at Lord's. Marylebone Cricket Club won by 2 wickets.

West 97 and 52; MCC 81 and 69/8.

5 August 1844 — West v Marylebone Cricket Club at Cricket Down, Bath. West won by 81 runs.

West 71 and 111; MCC 61 (Mynn 5/37) and 40 (Mynn 5/20).

16 June 1845 — Marylebone Cricket Club v West at Lord's. MCC won by 84 runs.

MCC 79 and 181; West 68 and 108.

18 August 1845 — West v Marylebone Cricket Club at Cricket Down, Bath. West won by an innings and 94 runs.

West 248 (Pilch 117); MCC 56 (Mynn 6/?) and 98 (Mynn 5/?).

5 September 1892 — East v West at United Services Recreation Ground, Portsmouth. West won by 48 runs.

West 186 (Shilton 6/63) and 163 (Hornsby 8/63); East 159 (Woods 7/56) and 142 (Woods 6/53).
Note : Sammy Woods (West) took thirteen wickets in the match with 7/56 and 6/53

3 September 1894 — East v West at United Services Recreation Ground, Portsmouth. Match drawn.

East 305 and 129/6d; West 272 and 71/0.

20 June 1910 — West v East at Cardiff Arms Park. West won by 4 wickets.

East 295 (Freeman 94; Dennett 5/94) and 112; West 199 and 210/6.

27 July 1927 — West v New Zealanders at County Ground, Exeter. Match drawn.

NZ 230-6d; West 93-9 (rained off).

8 September 1948 — East v West at Leyland Motors Ground, Kingston-upon-Thames. East won by 223 runs.

East 392 (Pawson 128*; Jenkins 5/84) and 304-8d (Todd 107); West 294 (Crapp 77; Sims 3/82) and 179 (Sims 10/90).
Note : Jim Sims (East) took thirteen wickets in the match, including the rare feat of ten wickets in an innings with his 10/90 in the second innings.

== Players ==
The following 68 players represented West in first-class matches:

- Tom Adams (1845)
- William Attfield (1845)
- Charles Awdry (1927)
- Billy Bancroft (1910)
- Thomas Box (1845)
- Len Braund (1910)
- Richard Busk (1927)
- George Butler (1927)
- Sam Cook (1948)
- Fred Cooper (1948)
- Jack Crapp (1948)
- Arthur Croome (1892)
- Samuel Dakin (1844-1845)
- George Davidson (1894)
- William Davies (1844)
- George Dennett (1910)
- Merrick Elderton (1927)
- George Elers (1910)
- George Emmett (1948)
- Sydney Falding (1927)
- J. J. Ferris (1894)
- William ffolkes (1845)
- B. S. Foster (1845)
- Gerald Fowler (1892)
- Leslie Gay (1892-1894)
- Arthur Gibson (1892)
- Ælfric Harrison (1927)
- Sir John Heathcoat-Amory, 3rd Baronet (1927)
- Perceval Henery (1892)
- Sir Frederick Hervey-Bathurst, 3rd Baronet (1844-1845)
- Herbie Hewett (1892-1894)
- Dick Howorth (1948)
- Roly Jenkins (1948)
- Gilbert Jessop (1910)
- Henry Kingscote (1844)
- George Lambert (1948)
- Thomas Langdon (1910)
- William Lautour (1844-1845)
- Talbot Lewis (1910)
- Bev Lyon (1948)
- Jack MacBryan (1927)
- Walter Marcon (1844)
- John Marshall (1844-1845)
- Edward Martin (1844-1845)
- Will Martingell (1844-1845)
- Robert McIntosh (1927)
- Harold Miles (1927)
- William Morgan (1892-1894)
- Billy Murdoch (1894)
- Alfred Mynn (1844-1845)
- Billy Newham (1894)
- Arthur Newman (1927)
- George Nichols (1892-1894)
- Albert Nutter (1948)
- Lionel Palairet (1892)
- Fuller Pilch (1844-1845)
- Massey Poyntz (1910)
- Francis Quinton (1894)
- Ernie Robson (1910)
- F. C. Smith (1844-1845)
- Villiers Smith (1844)
- Charlie Townsend (1894)
- Maurice Tremlett (1948)
- Ted Tyler (1892-1894)
- Ned Wenman (1844)
- Tom Whittington (1910)
- Andy Wilson (1948)
- Sammy Woods (1892-1910)
