= Richard Carter (cricketer) =

English cricketer

Personal information
- Full name: Richard Dring Carter
- Born: 19 July 1891; Hubberts Bridge, Lincolnshire, England
- Died: 24 August 1969 (aged 78); Stowbridge, Norfolk, England
- Batting: Right-handed

Domestic team information
- Years: Team
- 1920–1925: Norfolk

Career statistics
Competition	First-class
Matches	1
Runs scored	1
Batting average	0.50
100s/50s	–/–
Top score	1
Balls bowled	–
Wickets	–
Bowling average	–
5 wickets in innings	–
10 wickets in match	–
Best bowling	–
Catches/stumpings	–/–
- Source: Cricinfo, 25 July 2013

Richard Dring Carter (19 July 1891 – 24 August 1969) was an English cricketer. Born at Hubberts Bridge, Boston, Lincolnshire, Carter was a right-handed batsman.

Although born in Lincolnshire and educated at Wellingborough Grammar School, it was for Norfolk that Carter played minor counties cricket for, making his debut for the county against the Essex Second XI in the 1920 Minor Counties Championship. He played minor counties cricket for Norfolk from 1920 to 1925, making 44 appearances. He later made a single first-class appearance for an East of England cricket team against the touring New Zealanders in 1927 at Wisbech Cricket Club Ground. In a match which the New Zealanders won by eight wickets, Carter was dismissed in the East's first-innings by Curly Page for a duck, while in their second-innings he was dismissed for a single run by John Mills.

Later in life, he lived at Crabbs Abbey, Stowbridge, Norfolk. He died at Stowbridge on 24 August 1969. His brother, and later his son, played minor counties cricket for Norfolk.
