= William Morgan (cricketer, born 1862) =

Welsh cricketer

Personal information
- Full name: William Morgan
- Born: 1862; Nantgarw, Glamorgan, Wales
- Died: 22 October 1914 (aged 51/52); Porthleven, Cornwall, England
- Batting: Unknown
- Bowling: Unknown

Domestic team information
- Years: Team
- 1900–1901: Glamorgan

Career statistics
Competition	First-class
Matches	2
Runs scored	32
Batting average	10.66
100s/50s	–/–
Top score	24
Balls bowled	59
Wickets	3
Bowling average	10.66
5 wickets in innings	–
10 wickets in match	–
Best bowling	2/21
Catches/stumpings	2/–
- Source: Cricinfo, 29 September 2018

William Morgan (1862 – 22 October 1914) was a Welsh first-class cricketer.

Born at Nantgarw near Cardiff in 1862, Morgan made two appearances in first-class cricket, both for the West of England. Both matches came against the East in the East v West fixtures, with the first played at Portsmouth in September 1892, and the second played at the same venue in 1894. He took three wickets across the two matches. He later played minor counties cricket for Glamorgan in 1901 and 1902, making seven appearances in the Minor Counties Championship. He died at Porthleven, Cornwall, in October 1914.
