= John Searby =

English cricketer

Personal information
- Full name: John Epton Searby
- Born: 1 November 1900; Croft, Lincolnshire, England
- Died: 12 October 1956 (aged 55); Croft, Lincolnshire, England
- Batting: Right-handed

Domestic team information
- Years: Team
- 1924–1935: Lincolnshire

Career statistics
Competition	First-class
Matches	1
Runs scored	17
Batting average	8.50
100s/50s	–/–
Top score	10
Balls bowled	–
Wickets	–
Bowling average	–
5 wickets in innings	–
10 wickets in match	–
Best bowling	–
Catches/stumpings	–/–
- Source: Cricinfo, 25 July 2013

John Epton Searby (1 November 1900 – 12 October 1956) was an English cricketer. Born at Croft, Lincolnshire, Searby was a right-handed batsman.

Searby made his debut in minor counties cricket for Lincolnshire against Staffordshire in the 1924 Minor Counties Championship. He played minor counties cricket for Lincolnshire from 1924 to 1935, making fifty appearances. In 1927 he appeared in a single first-class match, having been selected for an East of England cricket team against the touring New Zealanders at Wisbech Cricket Club Ground. In a match which the New Zealanders won by eight wickets, Searby opened the batting and was dismissed in the East's first-innings by Tom Lowry for 10 runs, while in their second-innings he was dismissed for 7 runs by Herb McGirr.

He died at the village of his birth on 12 October 1956. His brother also played minor counties cricket for Lincolnshire.
