= Ælfric Harrison =

English cricketer (1889–1958)

Personal information
- Full name: Ælfric Milton Harrison
- Born: 28 July 1889; Blandford, Dorset, England
- Died: 2 June 1958 (aged 68); Clifton, Bristol, England
- Batting: Right-handed
- Bowling: Right-arm (unknown style)

Domestic team information
- Years: Team
- 1913: Sussex
- 1908–1946: Dorset

Career statistics
Competition	First-class
Matches	3
Runs scored	32
Batting average	6.40
100s/50s	–/–
Top score	14
Balls bowled	72
Wickets	1
Bowling average	33.00
5 wickets in innings	–
10 wickets in match	–
Best bowling	1/33
Catches/stumpings	3/–
- Source: Cricinfo, 19 July 2013

Ælfric Milton Harrison (28 July 1889 – 2 June 1958) was an English cricketer active in the first half of the twentieth century. A right-handed batsman and right-arm bowler, Harrison made three appearances in first-class cricket, but played the majority of his cricket in minor counties cricket for Dorset from 1908 to 1946.

== Career ==
Born at Blandford, Dorset and educated at Christ's Hospital and Sidney Sussex College, Cambridge, Harrison made his debut in the Minor Counties Championship for Dorset against the Surrey Second XI. He appeared regularly for Dorset in minor counties cricket prior to the First World War, gaining the attention of first-class county Sussex, who he made two first-class appearances for in the 1913 County Championship against Somerset and Kent. Harrison was not reengaged by the county following that season, and following the First World War, he resumed playing for Dorset. He briefly returned to first-class cricket when in 1927 he was selected for the West of England cricket team to play the touring New Zealanders at the County Ground, Exeter. Harrison continued to play for Dorset up until the start of the Second World War in 1939, and following its conclusion he played six further matches for the county in the first season after the war, the last of which came against Buckinghamshire. This was his 166th appearance in minor counties cricket.

He died at Clifton, Bristol on 2 June 1958. His brother Wilfrid also played for Dorset.
