= Robert Brooke (cricket writer) =

English cricket writer (1940–2025)

Robert William Brooke (5 May 1940 – 15 May 2025) was an English cricket writer who published more than 20 books about the game, including those referred to in the bibliography below.

== Life and career ==
Born in Solihull, Brooke attended school in Dorridge and Yardley Grammar School in Birmingham. He was a longtime Warwickshire CCC member who served as the club's honorary librarian for several years. He was also active in MCC, the Cricket Society and the Association of Cricket Statisticians and Historians (ACS), of which he was the co-founder in 1973.

Brooke was the ACS chairman from 1973 to 1979, remained on the committee until 1986 and was the editor of the ACS journal, the Cricket Statistician, from 1973 to 1985. He was elected as an Honorary Life Member of the ACS in 1987. He was named as 'Statistician of the Year' for 1989 and for 2011.

As of 2003, he was the statistician and obituarist of The Cricketer. Some of his articles for that publication can be found on Cricinfo within their player profiles.

Brooke died on 15 May 2025, at the age of 85.

== Bibliography ==
- Warwickshire Cricketers 1843-1973, Association of Cricket Statisticians, 1973.
- Warwickshire Cricket Record Book, Association of Cricket Statisticians, 1982.
- John Edward Shilton's Book, Association of Cricket Statisticians, 1984.
- Who's Who of English First Class Cricket, 1945-84, Collins Willow, 1985, ISBN 978-0-00-218096-2
- Cricket Firsts (with Peter Matthews), Guinness World Records Limited, 1988, ISBN 978-0-85112-365-3
- Cricket Grounds of Warwickshire, Association of Cricket Statisticians (Grounds Series), 1989.
- Who's Who of Warwickshire County Cricket Club (with David Goodyear), Robert Hale Ltd, 1989, ISBN 978-0-7090-3730-9
- A Who's Who of Worcestershire County Cricket Club (with David Goodyear), Robert Hale, 1990, ISBN 978-0-7090-4023-1
- A History of the County Cricket Championship, Gullane Children's Books, 1991, ISBN 978-0-85112-919-8
- Who's Who of Lancashire County Cricket Club, 1865-1990 (with David Goodyear), Breedon Books, 1991, ISBN 978-0-907969-85-3
- Warwickshire County Cricket Club First Class Records, 1894-1993, Limlow Books Ltd, 1994, ISBN 978-1-874524-09-0
- Warwickshire County Cricket Club (100 Greats), NPI Media Group, 2001, ISBN 978-0-7524-2180-3
- Middlesex CCC (100 Greats), NPI Media Group, 2003, ISBN 978-0-7524-2746-1
- F.R.Foster: The Fields Were Sudden Bare (Lives in Cricket), Association of Cricket Statisticians and Historians, 2011, ISBN 978-1-908165-02-2

== Sources ==
- Brooke, R. (1984) John Edward Shilton's Book, Association of Cricket Statisticians, Haughton Mill, Nottinghamshire. ISBN 0947774009
