= Robert McIntosh (cricketer) =

English cricketer

Personal information
- Full name: Robert Ian Fanshawe McIntosh
- Born: 19 August 1907; Darjeeling, Bengal, India
- Died: 21 March 1988 (aged 80); Budleigh Salterton, Devon, England
- Batting: Right-handed
- Bowling: Right-arm medium-fast

Domestic team information
- Years: Team
- 1933/34: Madras
- 1933/34: Europeans (India)
- 1927: West of England
- 1927: Devon
- 1927–1929: Oxford University

Career statistics
Competition	First-class
Matches	24
Runs scored	161
Batting average	11.50
100s/50s	–/–
Top score	23
Balls bowled	4,503
Wickets	69
Bowling average	32.92
5 wickets in innings	2
10 wickets in match	–
Best bowling	5/52
Catches/stumpings	9/–
- Source: Cricinfo, 20 March 2011

Robert Ian Fanshawe McIntosh (19 August 1907 – 21 March 1988) was an English cricketer born in Darjeeling, India. He was a right-handed batsman who bowled right-arm medium-fast.

McIntosh was educated at Uppingham School in Rutland, where he played for the school cricket team and for three years he was the mainstay of their bowling attack, captaining the side in 1926, a season in which he took 45 wickets at a bowling average of 11.45. He later went to University College, Oxford, where he played for the University Cricket Club, making his first-class debut in 1927 against the Harlequins. 1927 was also the year that McIntosh played his only first-class match for the West of England when they played the touring New Zealanders at the County Ground, Exeter; additionally in 1927 he also made three appearances for Devon in the Minor Counties Championship. From 1927 to 1929, McIntosh made 21 first-class appearances for Oxford University, playing his final match for them against Surrey.

McIntosh received his Oxford Blue in his first year of 1927, thanks largely to an injury to Walter McBride, and in 1928. Poor health and having to bowl on over-prepared wickets which led to a poor bowling season for him in 1929 ruled him out of contention for a Blue in that year. A bowler, he took 62 wickets in total for the University. These came at an average of 34.33 and included two five wicket hauls, with best figures of 5/52.

McIntosh later returned to the British Raj, where he played a single first-class match each for the Europeans (India) against the Indians and for Madras against the Marylebone Cricket Club, both in 1934. He died in Budleigh Salterton, Devon on 21 March 1988.
