= Arthur Newman =

Arthur Newman may refer to:

- Arthur Newman (baritone) (1908–2000), American operatic baritone and actor
- Arthur Newman (cricketer) (1883–1966), English first-class cricketer
- Arthur Newman (producer) (1924–2020), American film producer and executive
- Arthur Newman (film), an American film directed by Dante Ariola
