= John A. Walker (art critic) =

British art critic and historian (1938 – May 2023)

John Albert Walker (1938–2023) was a British art critic and historian who wrote over 15 books on modern and contemporary art with an emphasis on mass media. He also wrote on design history methodology. Walker's books include Art since Pop (1975), Design History and the History of Design with Judy Attfield (1990), John Latham: The Incidental Person - His Art and Ideas (1994), Cultural Offensive: America's Impact on British Art since 1945 (1998), Art & Outrage (1999), Supercollector: A Critique of Charles Saatchi with Rita Hatton (2000), Left Shift: Radical Art in 1970s Britain (2001), Art in the Age of Mass Media (3rd ed.: 2001), Art and Celebrity (2003), and Firefighters in Art and Media: A Pictorial History (2009).

Walker was a Reader in Art and Design History at Middlesex University near London until retiring in 1999. He was trained as a painter at Newcastle upon Tyne.

With regard to John Latham: The Incidental Person - His Art and Ideas (1994), John A. Walker wrote a contentious article on Artnet.com after John Latham's death. In it, Walker revealed that there was a legal conflict with Latham concerning the book. The article is titled "The Perils of Publishing". He also released legal letters concerning the conflict, in which he is quoted: "Latham acts as if he is the commissioner or patron of the book rather than its subject matter... He tries to treat me like a slave whose function is to write down exactly what he dictates. This is not on…".

In Art in the Age of Mass Media (2001), Walker writes thematic essays including how 'art uses mass culture', 'the mass media use art', for example, direct references to art in advertisements, 'art and new media technologies' and 'art and mass media 1990-2000'. In this last-mentioned chapter, for example, he refers to 'the artist as media celebrity: Damien Hirst', and writes: "During the 1990s, Damien Hirst [b. 1965] became Britain's most famous, young, living sculptor and painter, in part because of his own flair for self-promotion and the publicity skills of his primary patron Charles Saatchi... Saatchi, of course, was an expert at expoiting the mass media because of his long career in advertising."

In Art and Celebrity, Walker offers five thematic chapters including 'Celebrities as Art Collectors and Artists' showing artworks by Ronnie Wood of the Rolling Stones, and actors Anthony Quinn and Dennis Hopper, and shows Madonna awarding artist Martin Creed the UK's Turner Prize in 2001. Other chapters include 'Artists depict Celebrities', 'Simulation and Celebrities', 'Alternative Heroes' including the artwork The Dinner Party (1979) by Judy Chicago and Che (2000) depicting Che Guevara by Gavin Turk. The final chapter focuses on 'Art Stars' about the cult of the artist and the celebrity artist. This refers back to artists in the Italian Renaissance, to Rembrandt, and van Gogh. Particular attention is given to 20th/21st century artists: Picasso, Salvador Dalí, Jackson Pollock, Francis Bacon, David Hockney, Yoko Ono, Andy Warhol, Joseph Beuys, Gilbert & George, Julian Schnabel, Jean-Michel Basquiat, Jeff Koons, Damien Hirst, and Tracey Emin. In the conclusion, Walker lists out his view of the advantages and disadvantages of becoming an art star.

In June 2009, Walker produced a limited edition Saatchi branding iron. Artnet.com reported that the iron is "an actual implement that can be used to burn the collector's name into wooden stretcher bars, if not into "artist's flesh, dead cows, sheep and sharks, etc... Promised soon are 'GOGO' (art gallerist Larry Gagosian) and 'JAY JOP' (art gallerist Jay Jopling) branding irons as well".

== Death ==
Walker died in 2023, at the age of 84.
