= George Elers (cricketer) =

English cricketer

Personal information
- Full name: Charles George Carew Elers
- Born: 2 January 1867; Lyme Regis, Dorset, England
- Died: 11 December 1927 (aged 60); Antony, Cornwall, England
- Batting: Right-handed
- Role: Wicket-keeper

Domestic team information
- Years: Team
- 1910–1911: Glamorgan

Career statistics
Competition	First-class
Matches	1
Runs scored	4
Batting average	4.00
100s/50s	–/–
Top score	4
Catches/stumpings	5/1
- Source: Cricinfo, 20 July 2013

Charles George Carew Elers (2 January 1867 – 11 December 1927) was an English cricketer. Elers was a right-handed batsman who played as a wicket-keeper. He was born at Lyme Regis, Dorset, and died at Antony, Cornwall.

== Cricket ==
Elers played his county cricket for Glamorgan in the Minor Counties Championship, making his debut for the county against Carmarthenshire in 1910, with him making five further appearances for the county in that season. Following a score of 151 made against Carmarthenshire at Swansea, it was in 1910 that he was called up to represent a West of England team against the East of England in a first-class match at Cardiff Arms Park. In a match which the West won by four wickets, Elers batted once, scoring four runs before he was dismissed by Walter Mead, as well as taking five catches and making a single stumping in the match overall. The following season, he appeared once more for Glamorgan in the Minor Counties Championship against the Surrey Second XI. His father Charles Elers also played for Somerset, Dorset and the Channel Islands.

== Military ==
Active in the British Army during his life, Elers military service began in 1886 with the West Somerset Yeomanry as a lieutenant, while the following year he was promoted to 2nd lieutenant. It was in 1887 that he resigned his commission with the yeomanry. In 1889, Elers was once again serving in the military, this time in the Devonshire Regiment. By 1891, he had been appointed an instructor of Musketry. He resigned his commission with the Devonshire Regiment on 4 February 1899. He later served in the First World War with the, serving in as a captain in 1914. By war's end, Elers had obtained the rank of major, resigning his commission for a final time in 1919.
