= Richard Busk =

English cricketer (1895–1961)

Personal information
- Full name: Richard Dawson Busk
- Born: 21 June 1895; Marylebone, London, England
- Died: 24 December 1961 (aged 66); Rampisham, Dorset, England
- Batting: Right-handed
- Bowling: Right-arm fast

Domestic team information
- Years: Team
- 1912–1939: Dorset
- 1919: Hampshire
- 1920–1922: Marylebone Cricket Club

Career statistics
Competition	First-class
Matches	5
Runs scored	50
Batting average	12.50
100s/50s	–/–
Top score	5*
Balls bowled	534
Wickets	11
Bowling average	33.18
5 wickets in innings	–
10 wickets in match	–
Best bowling	4/60
Catches/stumpings	1/–
- Source: Cricinfo, 21 January 2010

Richard Dawson Busk BEM (21 June 1895 — 24 December 1961) was an English first-class cricketer and British Army officer.

The son of Warren Gould Busk (grandson of Wadsworth Busk), he was born at Marylebone in June 1895. He was educated at Marlborough College, where he played cricket, rugby and rackets for the college. While still a schoolboy at Marlborough College, Busk played minor counties cricket for Dorset in the Minor Counties Championship. From Marlborough, he attended the Royal Military College and was commissioned into the 9th Queen's Royal Lancers as a second lieutenant in December 1914, five months into the First World War. He was promoted to lieutenant in February 1916.

Following the war, he made two appearances in first-class cricket for Hampshire in 1919, against the Australian Imperial Forces cricket team and Surrey. The following year, he made one first-class appearance for the Marylebone Cricket Club (MCC) against the British Army cricket team, and played for the MCC again in 1923 against Scotland at Lord's. In the Royal Lancers, he was promoted to captain in March 1921, before being invalided due to ill health in March 1923. Thereafter, he was employed by the Air Ministry. Busk later appeared in his final first-class cricket match in 1927, for the West of England against the touring New Zealanders at Exeter. In five first-class matches, he took 11 wickets with his right-arm fast bowling at an average of 33.18, with best figures of 4 for 60. He played minor counties cricket for Dorset until 1939, making 142 appearances in the Minor Counties Championship since his debut in 1912. He took 344 wickets in minor counties cricket for Dorset. In later life, Busk was an officer with the Dorset Special Constabulary, holding the rank of assistant-commandant. For his service in the Constabulary, he was awarded the British Empire Medal in the 1957 New Year Honours. Busk died in December 1961 at Rampisham, Dorset.
