= Reginald Covill =

English cricketer

Personal information
- Full name: Reginald John Covill
- Born: 10 August 1905; Cambridge, Cambridgeshire, England
- Died: 18 March 2002 (aged 96); Colchester, Essex, England
- Batting: Right-handed
- Bowling: Right-arm fast

Domestic team information
- Years: Team
- 1933: Minor Counties
- 1930–1935: Marylebone Cricket Club
- 1928–1939: Cambridgeshire
- 1926–1927: Norfolk

Career statistics
Competition	First-class
Matches	12
Runs scored	322
Batting average	20.12
100s/50s	–/–
Top score	48
Balls bowled	1,216
Wickets	23
Bowling average	25.60
5 wickets in innings	1
10 wickets in match	–
Best bowling	5/31
Catches/stumpings	4/–
- Source: Cricinfo, 27 July 2013

Reginald John Covill (10 August 1905 – 18 March 2002) was an English cricketer active in the 1920s and 1930s. Born at Cambridge, Cambridgeshire, Covill was a right-handed batsman and right-arm fast bowler who played the majority of his cricket in minor counties cricket, though he did make twelve appearances in first-class cricket.

== Career ==
Covill made his debut in minor counties cricket for Norfolk against Staffordshire in the 1926 Minor Counties Championship. He played minor counties cricket for Norfolk in both 1926 and 1927, making seventeen appearances. It was in 1927 he made his debut in first-class cricket, having been selected for an East of England cricket team against the touring New Zealanders at Wisbech Cricket Club Ground. His maiden first-class wicket came in this match when he dismissed New Zealand captain Tom Lowry. Covill joined Cambridgeshire in 1928, making his debut for the county against Lincolnshire in the Minor Counties Championship. In 1930, he made a second appearance in first-class cricket when he played for the Marylebone Cricket Club (MCC) against Wales. Covill played regularly for the MCC over the next few seasons, making ten appearances in first-class cricket for the club, with his appearance against the Army in 1931 seeing him take his only first-class five wicket haul with figures of 5/31. He scored 304 runs in his ten matches for the MCC, averaging 21.71, with a high score of 48, while with the ball he took 20 wickets at an average of 27.30 runs per wicket. Covill also made a single first-class appearance for a combined Minor Counties cricket team against the touring West Indians in 1933. He also continued the play minor counties cricket for Cambridgeshire throughout the 1930s, making his final appearance for the county in 1939 against Suffolk, by which time he had made 88 appearances for Cambridgeshire.

He died at Colchester, Essex on 18 March 2002. His father and brother also played minor counties cricket for Cambridgeshire.
