= George Attfield =

English cricketer

Personal information
- Full name: George Cooke Atffield
- Born: 27 January 1826; Bath, Somerset
- Died: 16 January 1925 (aged 98); Hove, Sussex
- Relatives: William Attfield (brother)

Domestic team information
- Years: Team
- 1851–1855: Surrey Club

Career statistics
Competition	First-class
Matches	8
Runs scored	61
Batting average	4.35
100s/50s	0/0
Top score	11
Catches/stumpings	4/–
- Source: Cricinfo, 17 June 2013

George Cooke Attfield MRCS (27 January 1826 – 16 January 1925) was an English medical practitioner and first-class cricketer.

== Early life and background ==
George Attfield was born at Bath, Somerset. The entry in the Rugby School register for his brother William Attfield, also a cricketer, gives their father as "Rev. W. Attfield, Park-Street", Bath. The Rev. William Attfield, a graduate of Oriel College, Oxford, died at 14 Park Street, Bath in 1861, aged 71; a newspaper report from 1926 confirms he was George's father, and states he played twice for the Gentlemen against the Players. From 1814 he was a curate at St Alkmund, Shrewsbury, and in 1821 he married Mary Anne Cooke, third daughter of S. Cooke of Swan Hill House, Shrewsbury.

== Cricket ==
Attfield's batting style is unknown. He made his first-class debut for the Marylebone Cricket Club (MCC) against the West of England in 1845 at Cricket Down, Bath. His next first-class appearance came six years later in 1851 for the Surrey Club against the MCC at Lord's, with him making further first-class appearances for the Surrey Club, with two against the MCC in 1855 and a further two against the same opposition in 1855. He made two further first-class appearances for the Gentlemen of Surrey and Sussex in 1856, both against the Gentlemen of England. Attfield made a total of eight appearances in first-class cricket, scoring 61 runs at an average of 4.35, with a high score of 11.

== Early career ==
Attfield served as a special constable during the bread riots of 1848. He became a medical practitioner, qualifying as a surgeon at St Bartholomew's Hospital, in 1850, and being admitted a Member of the Royal College of Surgeons (MRCS). In 1852 he qualified as an apothecary. He was for a number of years the medical officer at Millbank Prison.

== In Western Australia ==
Attfield arrived in Australia in 1857. He later became the chief medical officer of prisons in Western Australia. He was appointed Imperial Surgeon to West Australia, a position he held to 1879. He was medical officer to Fremantle Gaol, and superintendent of Fremantle Lunatic Asylum. At the gaol, he kept a medical admission register, and compiled a number of reports. He opposed the use of solitary confinement and hard labour, as detrimental to the health of the convicts. The sanitary status of the gaol had been improving in the mid-1850s, in terms of accommodation, but he had some criticisms of his precessor David Rennie, in particular in his perceptions of tuberculosis. The medical historian Bryan Gandevia took a positive view of Attfield's "humane" approach, including exempting those with physical or mental illness from flogging.

In the 1860s and into the 1870s, Attfield took part in cricket matches between Fremantle and Perth, becoming Fremantle's captain and dropping out in 1873. While living in Australia, he was invited to join a touring All England Eleven, but declined the invitation. He was state amateur billiards champion, with local opponents Alfred Rosser (born 1826) and Henry Hetherington (born 1818). He owned Bushman, a noted racehorse, and was a steward of the Western Australian Turf Club. He often went shooting on Rottnest Island and its environs.

Attfield retired on a pension. He left Australia in 1879, on the SS City of New York bound for San Francisco.

== Later life ==
Returning to England and settling at Hove, Sussex, Attfield died there on 16 January 1925, just short of his 99th birthday. He was at the time of his death believed to be the oldest medical practitioner in England.

== Family ==
Attfield married in 1863, at St George's Cathedral, Perth, Alice Maude Roe, youngest daughter of John Septimus Roe, then aged 18. They had five daughters. Of the daughters, Maude Cecil married in 1892 Frederick John Paley, physician and son of Frederick Apthorp Paley.
