= Merrick Elderton =

English cricketer and educator

Personal information
- Full name: Merrick Beaufoy Elderton
- Born: 21 February 1884; Brentford, Middlesex, England
- Died: 11 December 1939 (aged 55); Sherborne, Dorset, England
- Batting: Right-handed
- Role: Wicket-keeper

Domestic team information
- Years: Team
- 1931: Minor Counties
- 1921–1938: Dorset
- 1907: Cambridge University

Career statistics
Competition	First-class
Matches	5
Runs scored	74
Batting average	12.33
100s/50s	–/–
Top score	24
Balls bowled	–
Wickets	–
Bowling average	–
5 wickets in innings	–
10 wickets in match	–
Best bowling	–
Catches/stumpings	4/5
- Source: Cricinfo, 21 November 2011

the Merrick Beaufoy Elderton MBE (21 February 1884 – 11 December 1939) was an English cricketer and educator. Elderton was a right-handed batsman who fielded as a wicket-keeper. He was born in Brentford, Middlesex.

Elderton was educated at Merchant Taylors' School, Northwood and later attended Clare College, Cambridge. While attending Clare College, Elderton made his debut in first-class cricket for Cambridge University against Lancashire in 1907. He made a further first-class appearances for the university in that season, against Yorkshire. His two appearances had limited success, with him scoring 17 runs at an average of 5.66, with a high score of 9, while behind the stumps he took 3 catches and made 3 stumpings. He also played for the Gentlemen of England against Cambridge University in 1907. He graduated from Cambridge in 1907, and in that same year he took up a teaching position with Sherborne School in Dorset, remaining there for the rest of his life apart from a period of war service. He taught Alan Turing there.

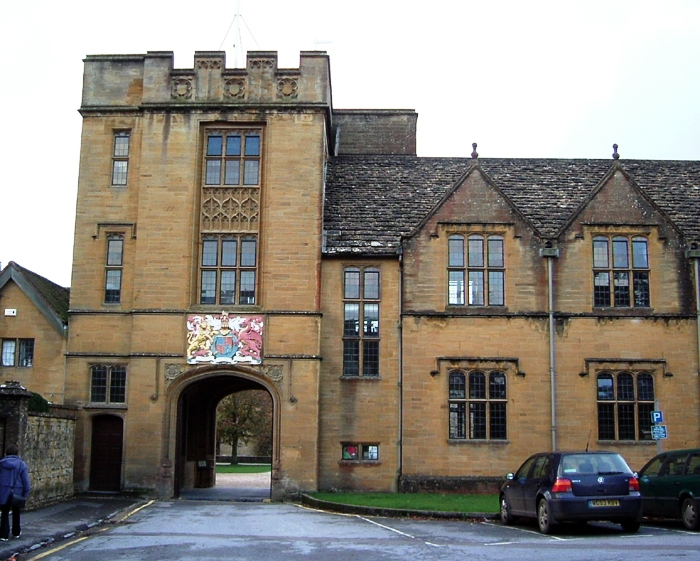
Elderton taught at Sherborne School from 1907 to 1939

Elderton served during World War I with the Royal Garrison Artillery, entering service in 1915. By July 1917, he hed been promoted from 2nd Lieutenant to Lieutenant. Later in September 1917 he was promoted to Acting Captain. He left the army in November 1918. Following the war, Elderton first appeared for Dorset in the Minor Counties Championship, making his debut for the county against Devon in 1921. In 1927, some twenty years after his last appearance in first-class cricket, he played a first-class match for the West against the touring New Zealanders at the County Ground, Exeter. In this match, Elderton scored 20 runs in the West's first-innings, before being dismissed by Tom Lowry. His final first-class appearance came for the Minor Counties against the touring New Zealanders in 1931. In this match, he scored 13 runs in the Minor Counties first innings, before being dismissed by Cyril Allcott, while in the second innings he was not required to bat. He continued to play Minor counties cricket for Dorset until 1938, making between 1921 and then, 134 Minor Counties Championship appearances.

He continued to teach at Sherborne School until his death on 11 December 1939. He died after being in collision with a cyclist while walking near his home in Sherborne. The cyclist was a boy named Alfred William Hatcher. Elderton had stepped on the road from the pavement and emerged from a behind a car when the cycle struck him on the right side. He fell face first on the road and died from a fracture of the skull and laceration of the brain.
