= Wyndham Hazelton =

English cricketer (1894–1958)

Personal information
- Full name: Edward Wyndham Hazelton
- Born: 8 May 1894; Buckingham, Buckinghamshire, England
- Died: 13 March 1958 (aged 63); Great Dunmow, Essex, England
- Batting: Right-handed
- Bowling: Leg break Right-arm medium

Domestic team information
- Years: Team
- 1930: Marylebone Cricket Club
- 1924: Minor Counties
- 1919: Essex
- 1912–1931: Buckinghamshire

Career statistics
Competition	First-class
Matches	8
Runs scored	77
Batting average	6.41
100s/50s	–/–
Top score	43
Balls bowled	1,157
Wickets	23
Bowling average	27.00
5 wickets in innings	2
10 wickets in match	1
Best bowling	6/45
Catches/stumpings	6/–
- Source: Cricinfo, 13 August 2011

Edward Wyndham Hazelton (8 May 1894 – 13 March 1958) was an English cricketer. Hazelton was a right-handed batsman who bowled both leg break and right-arm medium pace. He was born in Buckingham, Buckinghamshire, and was educated at Wellingborough School.

Hazelton made his debut in county cricket for Buckinghamshire in the 1912 Minor Counties Championship against Berkshire. He played for Buckinghamshire right up to the 1914 season, which was curtailed due to the start of World War I. Following the conclusion of the war, Hazelton appeared in a first-class match for Essex against the Australian Imperial Forces in 1919, though this only appearance for Essex came with no success with either bat or ball. Following this match, Hazelton continued to play Minor counties cricket for Buckinghamshire, he would wait four more years after his lone appearance for Essex for his next first-class appearance, which eventually came in 1924 for the Minor Counties against HDG Leveson-Gower's XI at The Saffrons in Eastbourne. His next first-class match came for the East of England against the touring New Zealanders in 1927, a match in which he took his maiden first-class five wicket haul, with figures of 5/68 in the New Zealanders first-innings.

His next first-class appearance came the following season for the Minor Counties against the touring West Indians, with Hazelton taking career best figures of 6/45 in the West Indians first-innings, this after he took 4 wickets in their first-innings, which gave him his only ten wicket haul in a match. Further first-class appearances came for the Gentleman in 1928, the North, the Minor Counties against the touring South Africans in 1929, and the Marylebone Cricket Club in 1930 against Yorkshire. Overall, Hazelton took 23 first-class wickets at an average of 27.00. He played Minor counties cricket for Buckinghamshire until 1931, having made a total of 68 Minor Counties Championship appearances.

He died at Great Dunmow, Essex, on 13 March 1958.
