= Albert Nutter =

English cricketer

Personal information
- Full name: Albert Edward Nutter
- Born: 28 June 1913; Burnley, England
- Died: 3 June 1996 (aged 82); Cape Town, South Africa
- Batting: Right-handed
- Bowling: Right-arm medium fast

Domestic team information
- Years: Team
- 1935–1945: Lancashire
- 1948–1953: Northamptonshire
- First-class debut: 31 August 1935 Lancashire v Sir Julien Cahn's XI
- Last First-class: 29 August 1953 Northamptonshire v Worcestershire

Career statistics
Competition	FC
Matches	224
Runs scored	4829
Batting average	19.55
100s/50s	1/19
Top score	109*
Balls bowled	38211
Wickets	600
Bowling average	26.28
5 wickets in innings	29
10 wickets in match	2
Best bowling	7/52
Catches/stumpings	163/–
- Source: Cricket Archive, 18 March 2011

Albert Edward Nutter (28 June 1913 – 3 June 1996) was an English cricketer who played over 200 first-class matches, mostly for Lancashire and Northamptonshire. He was a right-handed batsman and bowled at a medium fast pace. Born in the town of Burnley, he made his first-class debut for Lancashire in August 1935 at the age of 22. Nutter spent 10 years with Lancashire, during which time he played 70 matches for the side. In June 1939, he achieved his highest ever first-class score of 109 not out in the County Championship match against Nottinghamshire. During the same summer he spent one match as the club professional at Accrington Cricket Club in the Lancashire League.

During the early 1940s, while the County Championship was suspended due to the Second World War, Nutter played for many representative teams including the North of England, the West of England, a British Empire XI and the Royal Air Force. In 1945, he returned to the Lancashire League to play a season as the professional for Nelson Cricket Club, the club's first English professional for 24 years. Nutter joined Northamptonshire in the summer of 1948 and had his most successful season as a bowler, taking 105 wickets at an average of 22.88. He achieved career-best figures of 7–52 against Kent in July of that year. In April 1949, he played one match for the Marylebone Cricket Club against Essex. He remained with Northamptonshire until 1953, playing a total of 145 first-class matches for the county. By the end of his career, he had scored 4,829 runs at an average of 19.55, and amassed 600 wickets.

In later life, Nutter emigrated to South Africa and died in Cape Town on 3 June 1996, at the age of 82.
