= Arthur Newman (cricketer) =

English cricketer

Personal information
- Full name: Arthur William Newman
- Born: 15 September 1883; Westbury, Wiltshire, England
- Died: 16 March 1966 (aged 82); Melksham, Wiltshire, England

Domestic team information
- Years: Team
- 1903–1930: Wiltshire
- 1907–1923: Marylebone Cricket Club

Career statistics
Competition	First-class
Matches	5
Runs scored	39
Batting average	7.80
100s/50s	0/0
Top score	15*
Balls bowled	198
Wickets	2
Bowling average	28.50
5 wickets in innings	0
10 wickets in match	0
Best bowling	1/12
Catches/stumpings	4/–
- Source: Cricinfo, 29 September 2018

Arthur William Newman (15 September 1883 – 16 March 1966) was an English first-class cricketer.

Newman was born at Westbury, Wiltshire in September 1883. He made his debut in minor counties cricket for Wiltshire in the 1903 Minor Counties Championship.

His debut in first-class cricket came four years later for the Marylebone Cricket Club against Derbyshire at Lord's. He played further first-class matches for Marylebone in 1909 against Oxford University, and ten years later in 1919 against Cambridge University, before playing against the touring West Indians in 1923. His final appearance in first-class cricket came for the West of England against the touring New Zealanders at Exeter in 1927. He continued to play minor counties cricket for Wiltshire until 1930, by which time he had made 191 appearances in the Minor Counties Championship. He died at Melksham, Wiltshire in March 1966.
