= George Carnegie-Brown =

English cricketer

Personal information
- Full name: George Carnegie-Brown
- Born: 28 January 1906; Jerusalem, Ottoman Syria
- Died: 26 March 1964 (aged 57); Lincoln, Lincolnshire, England
- Batting: Left-handed

Domestic team information
- Years: Team
- 1947: Lincolnshire
- 1937: Minor Counties
- 1935–1946: Dorset
- 1926: Cambridge University
- 1923–1931: Cambridgeshire

Career statistics
Competition	First-class
Matches	4
Runs scored	78
Batting average	11.14
100s/50s	–/–
Top score	32
Balls bowled	–
Wickets	–
Bowling average	–
5 wickets in innings	–
10 wickets in match	–
Best bowling	–
Catches/stumpings	2/–
- Source: Cricinfo, 1 June 2011

George Carnegie-Brown (28 January 1906 – 26 March 1964) was an English cricketer. Carnegie-Brown was a left-handed batsman. He was born in Jerusalem, then in Ottoman Syria.

Carnegie-Brown made his debut for Cambridgeshire in the 1923 Minor Counties Championship against Buckinghamshire. He played Minor counties cricket for Cambridgeshire from 1923 to 1931. Carnegie-Brown studied at Cambridge University, making his first-class debut for the University Cricket Club against Nottinghamshire in 1926. This was his only first-class appearance for the university. The following season he played a single first-class match, this time representing the East of England cricket team against the touring New Zealanders.

In 1935 Carnegie-Brown joined Dorset, for whom he played until 1939 and then after the Second World War in 1946. Playing Minor counties cricket for Dorset allowed him to play for the Minor Counties cricket team, who he represented in 2 first-class match in 1937: against Ireland and Oxford University. Overall, Carnegie-Brown played 4 first-class matches, although with little success. He scored 78 runs at an average of 11.14, with a high score of 32. He finished his county cricket career in 1947, playing 4 Minor Counties Championship matches for Lincolnshire.

He died in Lincoln, Lincolnshire on 26 March 1964.
