= William Attfield =

English cricketer (1823–1876)

Personal information
- Full name: William Attfield
- Born: 12 March 1823; Bath, Somerset
- Died: 17 January 1876 (aged 52); Peckham, Surrey
- Relatives: George Attfield (brother)

Career statistics
Competition	First-class
Matches	1
Runs scored	0
Batting average	0.00
100s/50s	0/0
Top score	0
Catches/stumpings	0/–
- Source: Cricinfo, 5 October 2013

William Attfield (12 May 1823 – 17 January 1876) was an English cricketer. Attfield's batting style is unknown.

Born at Bath, Somerset, and educated at Rugby School, Attfield played club cricket for Lansdown Cricket Club, then considered the premier cricket team in Somerset. In 1845, he was selected to play a first-class match for the West of England against the Marylebone Cricket Club at Cricket Down. In a match which the West won by an innings and 94 runs, Attfield batted once, being dismissed for a duck by William Hillyer.

He died at Peckham, Surrey on 17 January 1876. His brother, George Attfield, also played first-class cricket.
