= Harold Miles =

English cricketer

Personal information
- Full name: Harold Philip Miles
- Born: 31 January 1899; Rosario, Santa Fe, Argentina
- Died: 21 July 1957 (aged 58); Newton Tracey, Devon, England
- Batting: Right-handed
- Bowling: Right-arm off break

Domestic team information
- Years: Team
- 1937/38: Europeans (India)
- 1928: Minor Counties
- 1927: West of England
- 1927–1933: Devon
- 1926/27: Marylebone Cricket Club
- 1920–1931: Army

Career statistics
Competition	First-class
Matches	23
Runs scored	613
Batting average	21.89
100s/50s	1/2
Top score	107
Balls bowled	2,233
Wickets	38
Bowling average	31.05
5 wickets in innings	2
10 wickets in match	–
Best bowling	5/74
Catches/stumpings	8/–
- Source: ESPNcricinfo, 13 April 2011

Harold Philip Miles (31 January 1899 – 21 July 1957) was an Argentinian-born English cricketer and British Army officer. Miles was a right-handed batsman who bowled right-arm off break. He was the elder son of Harold Miles of Odstock, Instow, Devon but was born in Rosario, Santa Fe. He moved to England at some point in his early life, where he was educated at Shrewsbury School, representing the school cricket team. In 1929 he married Miss Ada Margaret Paton, only daughter of Mr. James Paton, J.P., and Mrs. Paton of Newton Cross, Devon.

== Cricket ==
Miles made his first-class debut for the Army in 1920 against Cambridge University. Years later, in 1926, he toured the country of his birth with the Marylebone Cricket Club, playing four first-class matches against the Argentina national cricket team. A regular feature in the Army side, he played 12 first-class matches for the team up to 1930, with his final first-class match for the Army coming against Oxford University. In 1927, he joined Devon, who he represented in the Minor Counties Championship on 10 occasions to 1933. This paved the way for him to represent the West of England in 1927 against the touring New Zealanders and play for a Minor Counties cricket team against the touring West Indians in 1928. He also represented the Free Foresters and later the Europeans in two fixtures in 1937 against the Cricket Club of India and the Muslims. In total, Miles played 23 first-class matches. In these he scored 613 runs at a batting average of 21.89, scoring two half centuries and a single century which came for the Army against Oxford University in his second first-class match, in which he scored 107 runs before being dismissed by John Bettington. With the ball he took 38 wickets at a bowling average of 31.05, with two five wicket hauls and best figures of 5/74 which came for the Army against the touring New Zealanders when they toured in 1927.

== Military career ==
Miles served in the British Army and in 1920 was serving in the King's Shropshire Light Infantry as a second lieutenant. He was mentioned in the London Gazette in 1920 as having been promoted to the rank of lieutenant. Twelve years later he was seconded from King's Shropshire Light Infantry to act as an officer of a company of gentlemen cadets. In 1936 he held the rank of captain, but had relinquished his position as an instructor on 27 August 1936. Later serving in the Second World War, he had by 1944 reached the rank of major. In that same year he was mentioned in dispatches in a supplement to the London Gazette which detailed his promotion to lieutenant colonel. Following the war, Miles was placed on a disability list in September 1946. The nature of his disability is not known. By November 1947 his disability had taken its toll on Miles, and he retired from active service with the rank of lieutenant colonel. A decade later he died in Newton Tracey, Devon on 21 July 1957.
