= William Davies (English cricketer) =

English cricketer

Personal information
- Full name: William Davies
- Born: Unknown
- Died: Unknown
- Batting: Unknown

Career statistics
Competition	First-class
Matches	1
Runs scored	1
Batting average	0.50
100s/50s	–/–
Top score	1
Balls bowled	–
Wickets	–
Bowling average	–
5 wickets in innings	–
10 wickets in match	–
Best bowling	–
Catches/stumpings	–/–
- Source: Cricinfo, 20 July 2013

William Davies (dates of birth and death unknown) was an English cricketer. Davies' batting style is unknown.

Davies made a single first-class appearance for a West of England cricket team against the Marylebone Cricket Club at Lord's in 1844. In a match which the Marylebone Cricket Club won by two wickets, Davies was dismissed for a duck by William Lillywhite in the West's first-innings, while in their second-innings he was dismissed for a single run by Jemmy Dean.
