= Tomás Maldonado =

Argentine painter, designer, and thinker (1922–2018)

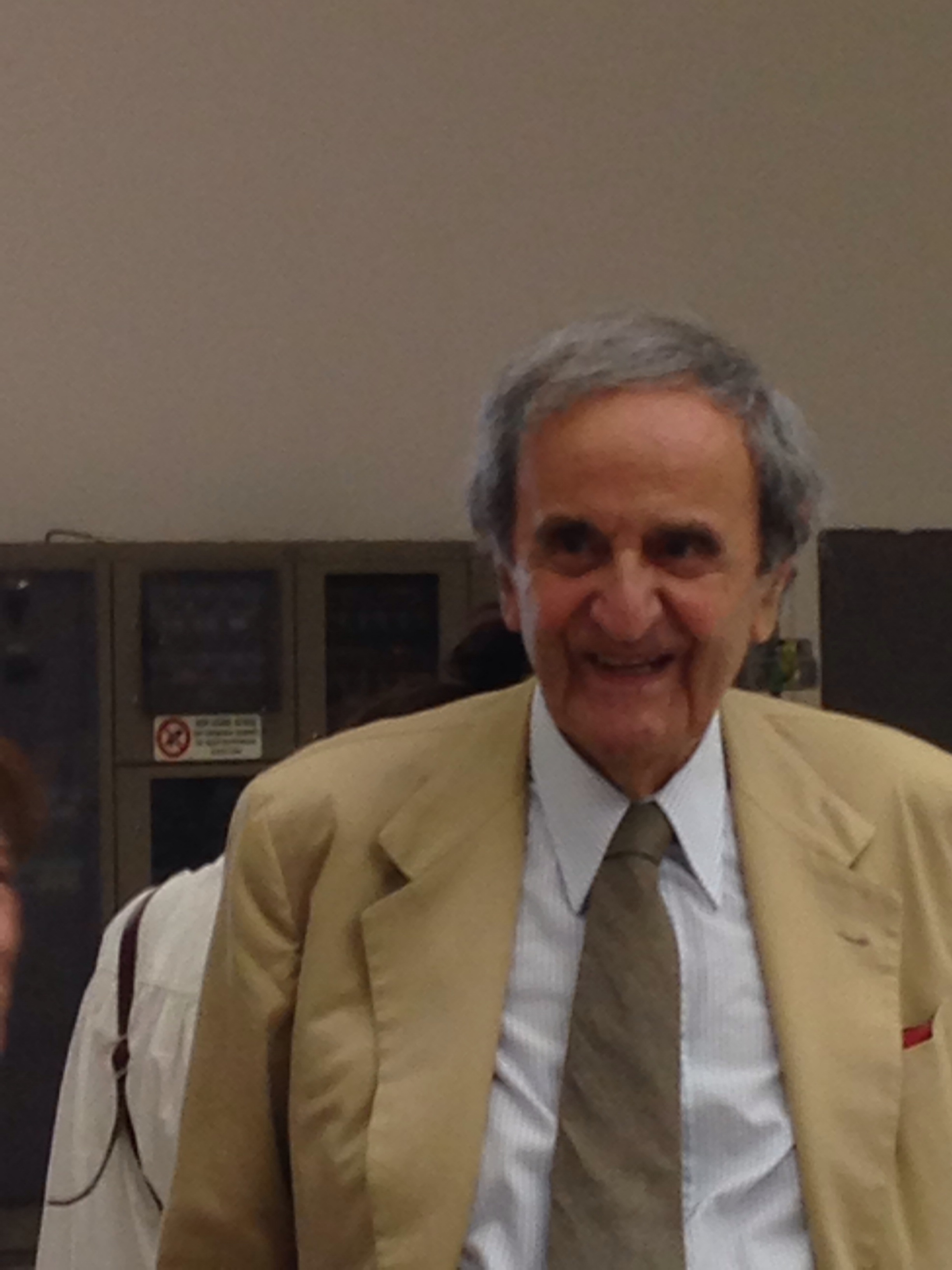
- Maldonado in Milan in 2014
- Born: 25 April 1922; Buenos Aires, Argentina
- Died: 26 November 2018 (aged 96); Milan, Italy
- Occupations: Painter; Philosopher; Industrial designer
- Years active: 1954–2018
- Known for: Ulm Model

Tomás Maldonado (25 April 1922 – 26 November 2018) was an Argentine painter, designer and thinker, considered one of the main theorists of design theory the legendary Ulm Model, a design philosophy developed during his tenure (1954–1967) at the Ulm School of Design (Hochschule für Gestaltung – HfG) in Germany.

== Early life ==
Born in the Argentine city of Buenos Aires, Maldonado's artistic formation took place at Escuela Nacional de Bellas Artes Prilidiano Pueyrredón.

== Career ==
=== The early years ===
In this early period he was involved with the Argentine Avant Gardes, and was one of the founders of the Asociación Arte Concreto-Invención movement in 1945. In 1951 he co-founded the magazine Nueva Visión with Alfredo Hlito, directing it until 1957. Published in Buenos Aires, Nueva Visión became an influential Spanish-language periodical devoted to art, architecture, industrial design and typography, and helped disseminate concrete art ideas throughout Latin America.

=== The Italian experience ===
Between 1964 and 1967, in collaboration with his German colleague Gui Bonsiepe he created a system of codes for the design program of the Italian firm Olivetti and the department store La Rinascente. In 1967 he established himself in Milan, continuing to teach in the Faculty of Philosophy and Literature of the University of Bologna, working almost entirely now in philosophy and criticism influenced by semiotics. In one of his last essays, "The Heterodox", he claims that the role of the intellectual is to awaken or reveal the collective conscience.

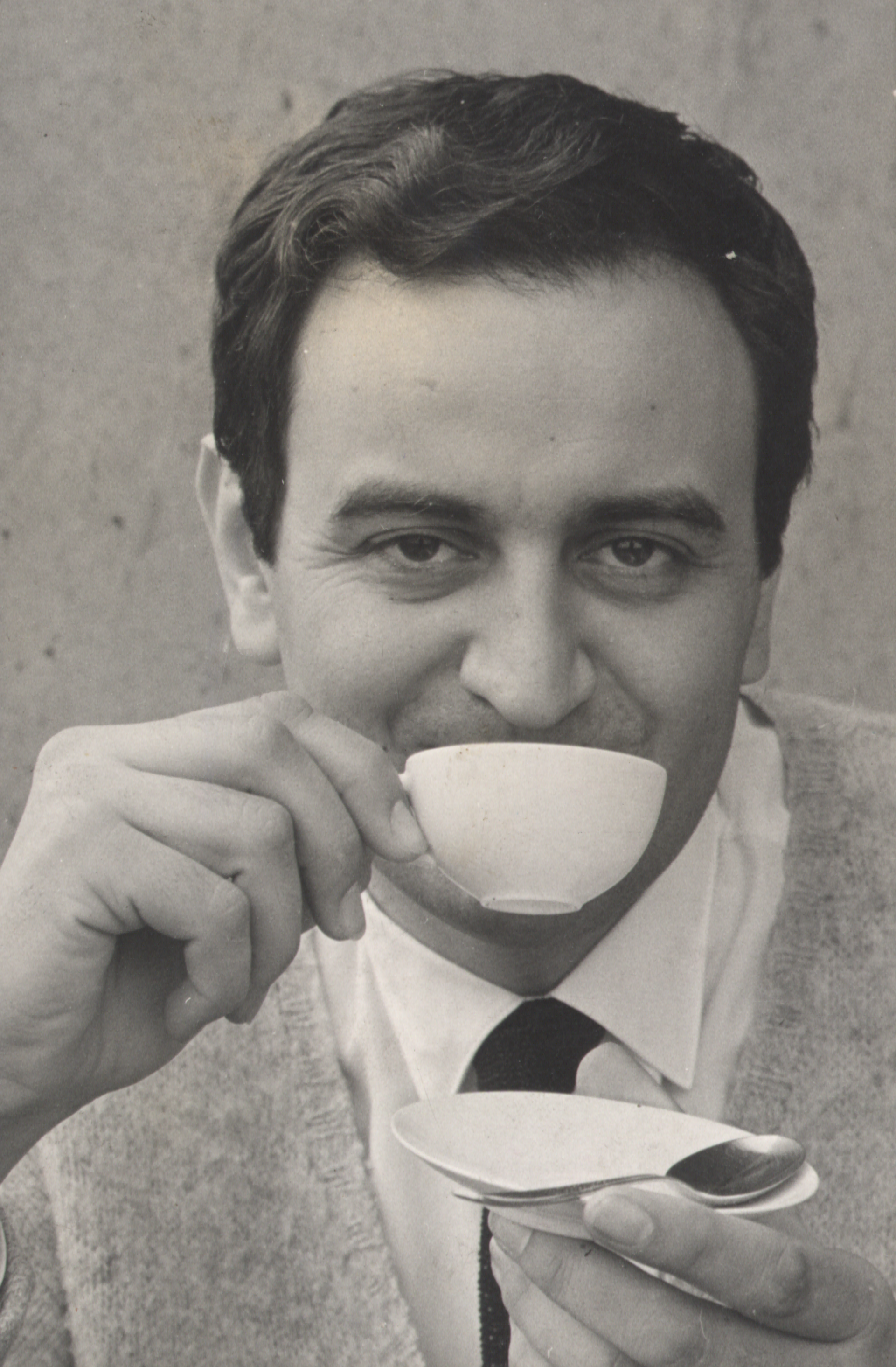
Tomás Maldonado (1956)

=== The academic career ===
- Tomás Maldonado was professor of Environmental Design (Progettazione Ambientale) at Politecnico di Milano University.
- Between 1954 and 1966 he taught at the Ulm School of Design (Hochschule für Gestaltung: HfG) in Germany and served as both Rector and Prorector. The leading contributor to the "Ulm Model", Maldonado oriented design education towards systems-thinking to attain a balance between science and design, and between theory and practice, incorporating planning methods, perceptual theory and semiotics, A description of the approach is his essay entitled, "Ulm, Science and Design".
- In 1965 he was the "Lethaby Lecturer" at London's Royal College of Art. The following year, he became a Council of Humanities Fellow at Princeton.
- Between 1967 and 1970 he taught the "Class of 1913" chair at Princeton's School of Architecture (SoA).
- In 1971 he was appointed to the philosophical faculty of Bologna University. Between 1976 and 1984 he worked as full professor of Environmental Design (Progettazione Ambientale) at University of Bologna's Faculty of Humanities and Philosophy.
- In 2012 he was granted the Konex Special Mention for his trajectory in Visual Arts of Argentina.

== Selected works ==
- Max Bill, Editorial Nueva Visión, Buenos Aires 1955
- Ulm, Science and Design (1964)
- La Speranza Progettuale (1970); Eng. trans.: Design, Nature, and Revolution: Toward a Critical Ecology (1972, 2019)
- Industrial Design reconsidered
- Is Architecture a Text?
- Towards an Ecological Rationalism
- Technique and Culture, the German debate between Bismarck and Weimar
- The Heterodoxo (1998)
