= Jack Mee =

English cricketer

Robert John Mee (25 September 1867 – 6 February 1941) was an English first-class cricketer active 1887–96 who played for Nottinghamshire. He was born and died in Shelford.
