= Bert Tremlin =

English cricketer

Personal information
- Born: 18 September 1876; Westerleigh, Gloucestershire, England
- Died: 12 April 1936 (aged 58); Essex, England
- Batting: Right-handed
- Bowling: Right-arm medium-pace
- Role: Bowler

Domestic team information
- Years: Team
- 1900–1919: Essex

Career statistics
Competition	FC
Matches	136
Runs scored	1843
Batting average	13.55
100s/50s	0/6
Top score	61
Balls bowled	22467
Wickets	467
Bowling average	25.82
5 wickets in innings	23
10 wickets in match	4
Best bowling	9/126
Catches/stumpings	64/0
- Source: Cricinfo, 23 July 2013

Bert Tremlin (18 September 1877 – 12 April 1936) was an English cricketer. He played for Essex between 1900 and 1919.

Tremlin was a right-arm medium-pace off-spin bowler who kept a good length, and a useful tail-end batsman. His best first-class figures were 9 for 126 in the victory over Derbyshire in May 1905, when he also scored 57 not out at number 10, adding 129 for the ninth wicket with Charlie McGahey, who made 277.

Tremiln spent the seasons from 1907 to 1909 playing as the professional for Colne in the Lancashire League before returning to Essex. In the 1914 season he took 101 wickets at an average of 26.00.
