= Ray Frearson =

English cricketer

Personal information
- Full name: Raymond Eric Frearson
- Born: 14 January 1904; Lincoln, Lincolnshire, England
- Died: 26 February 1991 (aged 87); Skegness, Lincolnshire, England
- Batting: Right-handed
- Bowling: Leg break

Domestic team information
- Years: Team
- 1931: Minor Counties

Career statistics
Competition	First-class
Matches	3
Runs scored	19
Batting average	6.33
100s/50s	–/–
Top score	13
Balls bowled	–
Wickets	–
Bowling average	–
5 wickets in innings	–
10 wickets in match	–
Best bowling	–
Catches/stumpings	1/–
- Source: Cricinfo, 12 April 2012

Raymond Eric Frearson (14 January 1904 – 26 February 1991) was an English cricketer. Frearson was a right-handed batsman who bowled Leg break. He was born in Lincoln, Lincolnshire and he died in Skegness, Lincolnshire.
