= Judy Attfield =

British design historian (1937–2006)

Judith (Judy) Attfield (1937 – December 2006) was a British design historian who specialized in the feminist approach towards design and design history as well as the cultural values of everyday design. An obituary describes her as "one of the pioneers of contemporary material culture studies who did so much to demonstrate the value of this approach".

== Biography and research ==
Attfield worked as a designer before studying design history, gaining a master's degree from Middlesex Polytechnic, with a thesis on tufted carpets, followed by a PhD from the University of Brighton in 1992/3, researching the furniture industry, under the supervision of Suzette Worden and Daniel Miller. She taught at the University of Brighton and Winchester School of Art, holding a Leverhulme Emeritus Fellowship in her retirement. She served on the editorial boards of the Journal of Design History and Home Cultures.

One focus of Attfield's academic work was everyday objects. She wrote the textbook Wild Things: The Material Culture of Everyday Life (2000), which Miller describes as "surely the single best introduction and exemplification of this new genre of design history studies, and a major advance in material culture studies more generally." Grace Lees-Maffei comments that in it, Attfield succeeds in going "beyond the high/low dichotomy ... to value everyday things." She also edited a special issue of Home Cultures on Kitsch.

Another focus was feminist design history. In 1986, she co-edited Women Working in Design, A Resource Book with Tag Gronberg. In 1989, she wrote the chapter "FORM/female FOLLOWS FUNCTION/male: Feminist Critiques of Design", which Lees-Maffei describes as "an extremely influential follow-up" to a 1986 article by Cheryl Buckley. She also co-edited A View from the Interior: Feminism, Women And Design with Pat Kirkham (1989) and wrote on gendered dolls.

Attfield died in December 2006. Her final collection, Bringing Modernity Home: Writings on Popular Design and Material Culture (2006), appeared posthumously, with a selection of twelve articles first published between 1984 and 2002. Anne Wealleans, in a review for Studies in the Decorative Arts, describes it as "a reminder of just how important her work was, and continues to be, for the development of the subject into the twenty-first century."

== Selected works ==
Authored book

- Attfield J. 2000, Wild Things. Berg

Edited books

- Attfield, J. and Kirkham, P. (eds) 1995, A View from the Interior, The Women's Press (including her "Inside Pram Town: a case study of Harlow House Interiors 1951–1961")
- Attfield, J. (ed.) 1999, Utility Reassessed. Manchester University Press

Articles and book chapters

- Attfield, J. 1994, The tufted carpet in Britain: its rise from the bottom of the pile 1952-1970 Journal of Design History 7: 3
- Attfield, J. 1997, Design as a practice of modernity. Journal of Material Culture 3: 2
- Attfield J. 1999, “Bringing modernity home: open-plan in the British domestic interior”, in At Home: An Anthology of Domestic Space Ed. I Cieraad
- Attfield, J. (ed.) 2006, Kitsch. Home Cultures 3: 3
