= Gui Bonsiepe =

German designer, teacher and writer

- Born: 23 March 1934
- Alma mater: Jan van Eyck Academie
- Occupation: Designer, industrial designer

Gui Bonsiepe [ˈgɪː ˈbo˘nsɪːpe˘] (born 23 March 1934) is a German designer, teacher and writer. Especially in South America and Germany, his publications are considered standards of design theory.

== Life ==
Gui Bonsiepe was born in Glücksburg, and studied Graphics and Architecture until 1955 at Bayerische Akademie der Schönen Künste, Munich and at the Technical University of Munich. Until 1959, he studied at Ulm School of Design (Hochschule für Gestaltung Ulm) in the Information Department. Between 1960 and 1968, he worked as an assistant professor at Ulm School of Design. After closure of the Ulm School of Design in 1968, Bonsiepe relocated to South America, working as a design consultant. From 1970 to 1973, he led the design team for the operations room of the Cybersyn project. From 1987 to 1989, Bonsiepe worked as an interface designer in a software company in Emeryville, California, United States.

From 1993 to 2003, Bonsiepe was Professor for Interface Design at Köln International School of Design (KISD) in Germany. He was Professor for Integrated Media at Escola Superior de Desenho Industrial (ESDI), Universidade do Estado de Rio de Janeiro, where he planned and established a Master of Design study program.

He was one of the three keynote speakers at Design History Society Annual Conference (2013) at National Institute of Design, Ahmedabad, along with Sujata Keshavan and Tapati Guha-Thakurta. He had visited NID in 1979 too as one of the speakers in United Nations Industrial Development Organization – ICSID conference.

He lives in La Plata, Buenos Aires and in Florianópolis, Brasil.

== Publications ==
- Precariousness & Ambiguity: Industrial Design in Dependent Countries in: Design for Need, edited by J. Bicknell and L. McQiston. London: Pergamon Press, 1976.
- A ‘Tecnologia’ da Tecnologia foreword: Darcy Ribeiro ed. São Paulo: Edgard Blücher, 1983.
- On some virtues of design. Publications of the Jan van Eyck Academy. Maastricht: Jan van Eyck Academy, 1998.
- Interface: An approach to design edited by Dawn Barrett. Maastricht: Jan van Eyck Academy, 1999.
- Diseño y crisis Valencia: campgrafic, 2012.
- On the Heteronomy of Design in a Post-Utopian Age in: After the Bauhaus, Before the Internet: A History of Graphic Design Pedagogy, edited by Geoff Kaplan, 264-70. New York / San Francisco: npp No Place Press, 2022.
- The Disobedience of Design, edited by Lara Penin. London: Bloomsbury, 2022.
