= Design History Society =

The Design History Society is an arts history organisation founded in 1977 to promote and support the study and understanding of design history. The Society undertakes a range of charitable activities intended to encourage and support research and scholarship, to offer information and create networking opportunities, to foster student participation and public recognition of the subject, and to support regional links and events. The Society welcomes members from related disciplines such as anthropology, architecture and art history, business history, the history of science and technology, craft history, cultural studies, economic and social history, design and design management studies. An elected Executive Committee and Board of Trustees works to enable the activities of the Society, and to ensure that design history is appropriately represented in higher education and research bodies in the UK.

== Journal ==
The Journal of Design History is published quarterly by Oxford University Press on behalf of the Design History Society (J Design Hist, web ISSN 1741-7279, print ISSN 0952-4649). It is the leading journal in its field, and plays an active role in the development of design history, including the history of crafts and applied arts, as well as contributing to the broader fields of visual and material culture studies. The journal includes a regular book reviews section and lists books received, and from time to time publishes special issues.

== Conference ==
The annual DHS Conference provides an international platform for interdisciplinary approaches to research and critical debate in design history. Hosted each year by a different partner institution, the conference aims to further global dialogues on design and its histories. See Past Conferences below.

== Funding ==
- A range of annual Research Grants encourage debate and research in design history. Individual grants are awarded to support particular research activities, including exhibitions, publication costs, travel and conference attendance, and scholarship in non-Western, post-colonial and other underrepresented areas of research.
- The Day Symposium Grant supports DHS members who wish to discuss and disseminate new design history research by convening a one-day symposium.
- The Outreach Grant assists DHS members convening a public event to promote design history beyond a traditional academic setting.
- Student members benefit from a Student Travel Award and DHS Conference Bursary scheme.

== Prizes ==
- Launched in 2017, the Design Writing Prize recognises outstanding writing that engages academic and non-academic audiences in critical and contemporary issues in design.
- The Student Essay Prize, established in 1997, is awarded to one undergraduate and one postgraduate essay each year to celebrate excellence in student writing in design history.

== Events ==
In 2018, the DHS launched a rolling calendar of events and activities convened by trustees working with relevant educational, professional and cultural partners. These events create opportunities for engagement beyond the annual conference, support teaching and learning at all levels of design historical education, and aim to reach audiences, both internationally and across the UK.

== Membership ==
Design History Society members include all those interested in design: students, designers, lecturers, historians, researchers, craftspeople, manufacturers, archivists, curators, librarians and collectors. The Society offers membership rates for individuals and institutional members. A concessionary rate is also available for students, full and part-time, the unwaged and seniors. Membership under all categories is administered by Oxford University Press.

== Past conferences ==
Year	Conference Title	Location
2019	The Cost of Design	Northumbria University, Newcastle-upon-Tyne
2018	Design and Displacement	Parsons School of Design, New York
2017	Making and Unmaking the Environment	University of Oslo, Norway
2016	Design and Time	Middlesex University, London
2015	Design and the Spirit of Critical Utopianism	California College of the Arts, San Francisco
2014	Design for War and Peace	Department for Continuing Education, University of Oxford
2013	Towards Global Histories of Design: Postcolonial Perspectives	National Institute of Design, Ahmedabad, India
2012	The Material Culture of Sport	University of Brighton
2011	Design Activism and Social Change	Barcelona
2010	Design and Craft: A History of Convergences and Divergence (co-organised by the ICDHS)	Brussels
2009	Writing Design: Object, Process, Discourse, Translation	University of Hertfordshire
2008	Networks of Design	University College Falmouth
2007	Design / Body / Sense	Kingston University London
2006	Design and Evolution	Delft University of Technology, The Netherlands
2005	Locating Design	London Metropolitan University
2004	The Politics of Design	University of Ulster at Belfast, Northern Ireland
2003	Sex Object: Desire & Design in a Gendered World	Norwich School of Art and Design
2002	Situated Knowledges: Consumption, Production and Identity in a Global Context	University of Wales, Aberystwyth
2001	Representing Design	Royal College of Art & Victoria and Albert Museum, London.
2000	Making and Unmaking: Creative and Critical Practice in a Designed World	University of Portsmouth
1999	Home and Away	Nottingham Trent University
1998	Design Innovation: Conception to Consumption	University of Huddersfield
1997	The Ideal and the Real in Design	University of Brighton
1996	History and Studio Practice (Co-organised with AAH and Dept of Visual Arts, Lancaster University)	Manchester Metropolitan University
1996	Futures	Middlesex University
1995	Objects Histories and Interpretations (co-organised with the AAH and V&A)	Victoria & Albert Museum, London
1994	Design for Selling	Glasgow School of Art
1993	Transportation and Movement	Southampton
