= John Shilton =

English cricketer

Personal information
- Full name: John Edward Shilton
- Born: 2 October 1861; Horbury, Yorkshire, England
- Died: 27 September 1899 (aged 37); Sedbergh, Yorkshire, England
- Batting: Right-handed
- Bowling: Left-arm orthodox spin Left-arm medium
- Role: Bowler

Domestic team information
- Years: Team
- 1894–1895: Warwickshire
- First-class debut: 2 June 1884 North v South
- Last First-class: 29 June 1895 Warwickshire v Yorkshire

Career statistics
Competition	First-class
Matches	24
Runs scored	203
Batting average	9.22
100s/50s	0/0
Top score	30
Balls bowled	3,863
Wickets	71
Bowling average	22.97
5 wickets in innings	4
10 wickets in match	0
Best bowling	7/75
Catches/stumpings	17/–
- Source: CricketArchive, 25 December 2015

John Edward Shilton (2 October 1861 – 27 September 1899) was an English cricketer who played first-class cricket in 1894 and 1895 for Warwickshire and in non-first-class games for the county from 1885. He was born at Horbury, West Yorkshire and died at Sedbergh, now in Cumbria. He was known to his contemporaries as "Jack Shilton". At birth, his surname was registered as "Shelton".

== Professional cricketer ==
Shilton was an itinerant professional cricketer who had engagements across the 1880s and 1890s with clubs in the North of England, Yorkshire, Kent and the West Midlands, where he settled from about 1885; he played in minor matches for Durham, Northumberland and Yorkshire before becoming involved with Warwickshire in 1885. He then played in every one of the county's matches for the next 10 seasons, though only in 1894 and 1895 were the games rated as first-class.

Shilton was a lower-order right-handed batsman and a left-arm bowler variously described as slow orthodox spin and medium-pace with the ability to "break both ways and vary his pace without in any way altering his action". His best bowling was achieved before Warwickshire gained first-class status: in the match against Leicestershire in 1888, for example, he finished the game with four wickets in four balls. Despite not playing for a major team, Shilton was selected for occasional first-class representative matches across the 1880s, appearing in the North v South game in 1884 and in England XIs against the 1886 and 1888 Australians. He was credited, alongside Harry Pallett, with the bowling prowess that led to Warwickshire's elevation to first-class status, and Lord Hawke was quoted as saying, when Warwickshire was a "second class" county, that "Shilton was the only first-class man in the team".

== Character ==
Shilton was not lacking in self-confidence: he was, according to his obituary in Wisden Cricketers' Almanack, "quite a character... though he had his faults". Other stories about him indicate a degree of arrogance. "He earned the name of Lord Warwick on account of his haughty bearing, and he had a very high opinion of his own powers," said one obituary. It added, however, "with all his faults, and unfortunately they were many, Shilton was popular for his remarkable optimism, his good nature, and for his undoubted ability".

== Later career ==
By the time he played regular first-class cricket in 1894, those abilities were on the wane, though he managed to take 50 first-class wickets at a respectable average of 20.82 in his only full season. His best bowling figures in first-class games came in the match against Nottinghamshire when he took seven second-innings wickets for 73 runs. By 1895, he was ill with the tuberculosis that killed him four years later, and he played in only four matches; one of those was a benefit match for him which was intended to raise funds to help him to go to South Africa, where it was hoped he might recover. Typically, Shilton spent the money, but well-wishers and events such as a "smoking concert" subscribed enough for him to make the trip. He got into unspecified trouble in South Africa, however, and returned to England in 1897; too ill to continue his cricket career, he lived with his father in Sedbergh until his death.
