= Harecroft Road =

Cricket ground in Cambridgeshire, England

Coordinates: 52.6691°N 0.1521°E

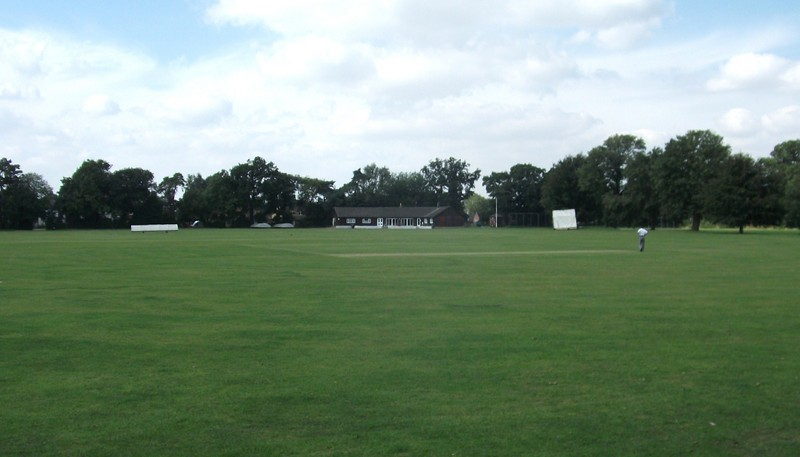
- Interactive map of Harecroft Road

Ground information
- Location: Wisbech, Cambridgeshire
- Country: England
- Establishment: 1926 (first recorded match)

Team information
Cambridgeshire	(1926–2018)
East	(1927)
- As of 21 August 2010; Source: Ground profile

Harecroft Road is a cricket ground in Wisbech, Cambridgeshire. The first recorded match on the ground was in 1926, when Cambridgeshire played the Leicestershire Second XI in the Minor Counties Championship. Cambridgeshire have used the ground periodically and until 2009 the ground has hosted 58 Minor Counties Championship matches and 5 MCCA Knockout Trophy matches.

Harecroft Road has held a single first-class match when the East of England cricket team played the touring New Zealanders in 1927.

The ground has also staged List-A matches, the first between Cambridgeshire and Oxfordshire in the 1967 Gillette Cup. Between 1967 and 1997, the ground played host to four List-A matches, the last of which saw Cambridgeshire play Hampshire in the 1997 NatWest Trophy.

In local domestic cricket, the ground is the home venue of Wisbech Cricket Club who play in the East Anglian Premier League as of 2023.
