= Lansdown Cricket Club Ground =

English cricket ground

Coordinates: 51.3896°N 2.3904°W

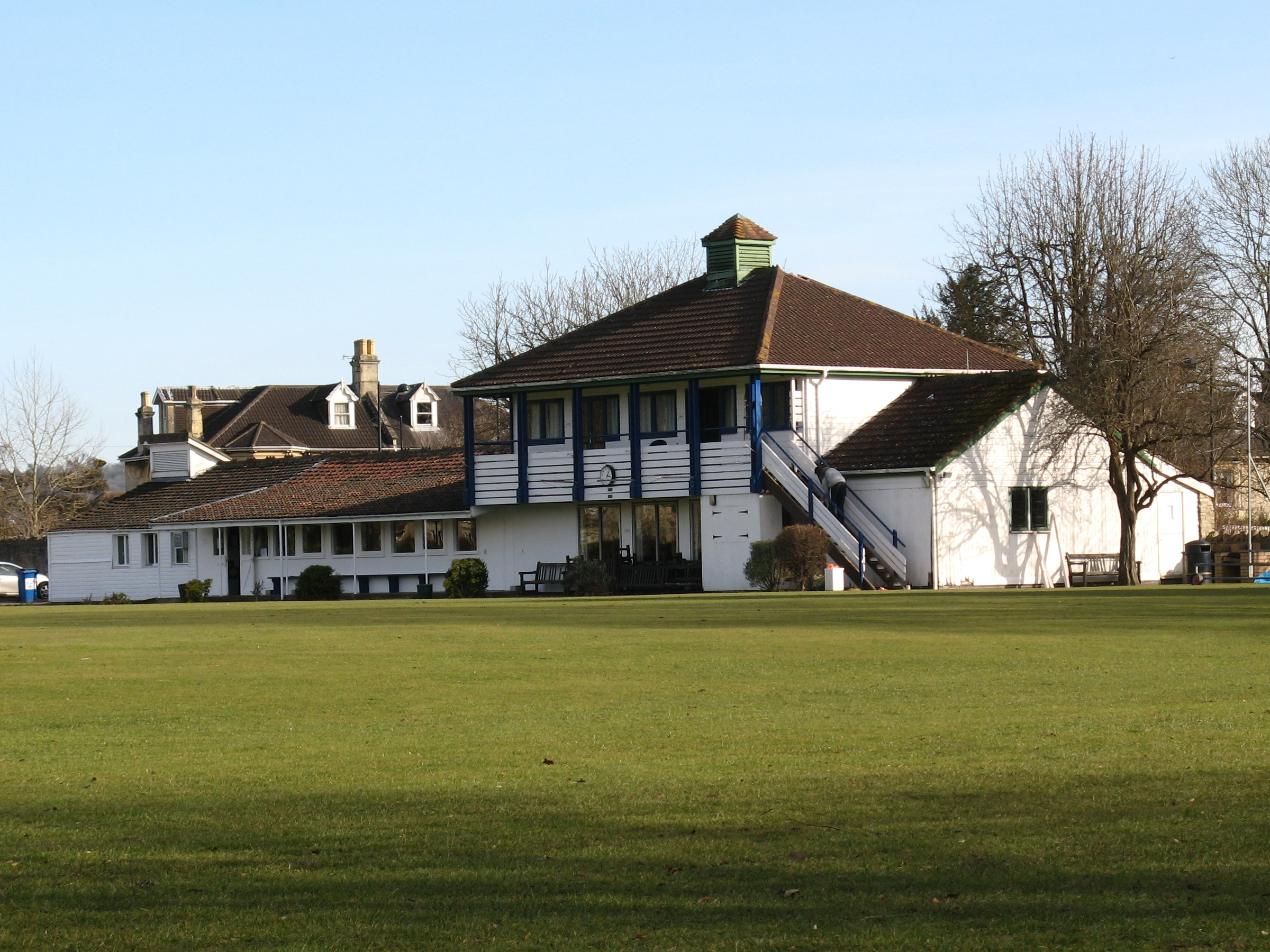
Lansdown's Combe Park Ground

Lansdown Cricket Club Ground is the cricket grounds in Bath, Somerset. Between 1825 and 1850, it was the name given to Lansdown Cricket Club's (LCC) ground 'Cricket Down'. In 1850, LCC moved to Sydenham Field, also in Bath. In 1869 the club moved again, and the name was then used for their 'Combe Park' ground, where they have played ever since.

== Grounds ==
=== Cricket Down ground ===
Used by Lansdown Cricket Club until 1850, this ground also hosted two first-class cricket matches in 1844 and 1845.

=== Sydenham Field ===
Although not referred to as 'Lansdown Cricket Club Ground', Sydenham Field was used by Lansdown Cricket Club from 1850 until 1869, Sydenham Field was also used by both the 'Gentlemen of Gloucestershire' and the 'Gentlemen of Somerset' for a small number of home fixtures.

=== Combe Park ground ===
Following their 1869 move from Sydenham Field, the club have played at Combe Park ever since. Somerset County Cricket Club played the only first-class match on the ground, hosting Hampshire in 1884. Somerset have also used the ground for Second XI fixtures in 1959 and 1990, and for a number of Minor Counties and Under-25 fixtures.
