= County Ground, Exeter =

Cricket ground in Devon, England

Coordinates: 50°43′59.69″N 3°31′46.40″W

County Ground
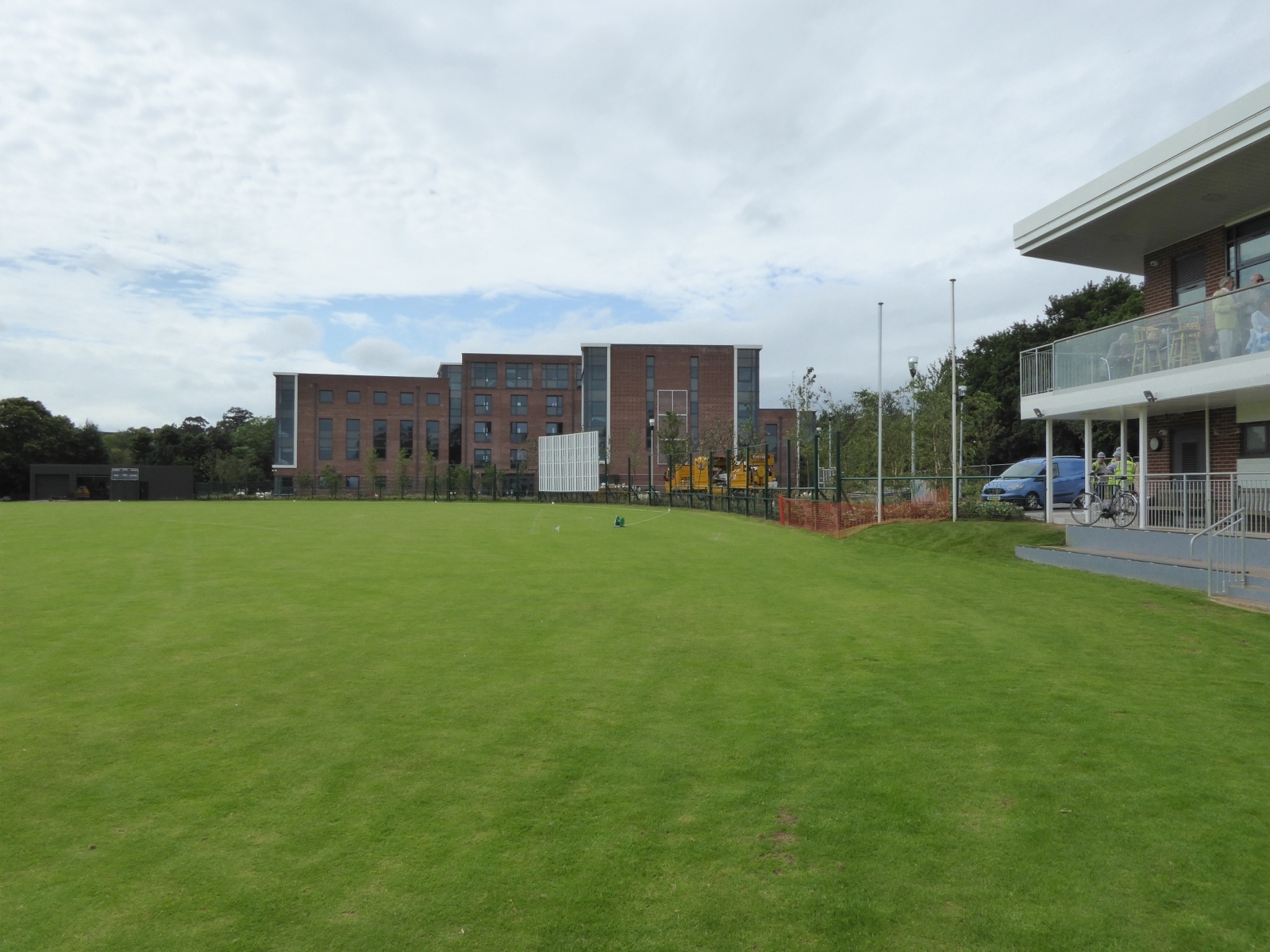
- The new pavilion on the County Ground
- Interactive map of County Ground

Ground information
- Location: Exeter, Devon
- Country: England
- Establishment: 1889 (first recorded match)

Team information
Devon	(1902–current)
Exeter CC	(1904–current)
Devon Dumplings CC	(1902–current)
- As of 16 April 2023; Source: Ground profile

The County Ground is a cricket ground in Exeter, Devon. The earliest recorded match on the ground was in 1889 between the Gentlemen of Devon and Somerset. In 1902, Devon played their first Minor Counties Championship match on the ground, which was against Wiltshire. From 1902 to 1987, the ground played host to 148 Minor Counties Championship matches and a single MCCA Knockout Trophy match between Devon and Oxfordshire in 1984. The ground hosted its first Minor Counties match in 23 years in May 2010, when Devon played Wales Minor Counties.

The ground has hosted two first-class matches, the first of which came in 1927, when the West played the touring New Zealanders. The second and final first-class match played on the ground came the following year, when a combined Minor Counties cricket team played the touring West Indians.

The only List-A match played on the ground came in the 1980 Gillette Cup between Devon and Cornwall, which Devon won by 145 runs.

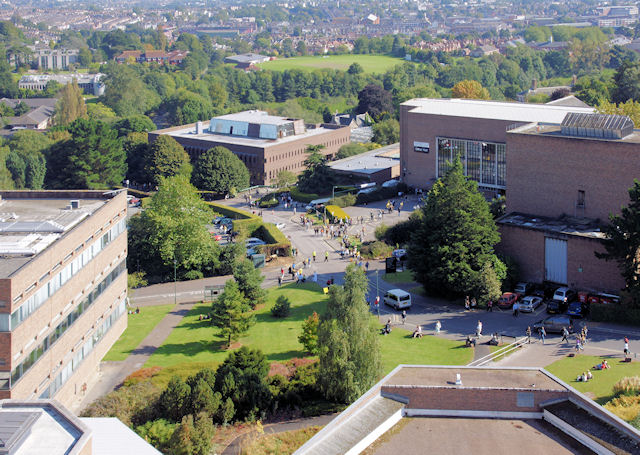
The University of Exeter, with the County Ground at the top centre of image

In local domestic cricket, the County Ground is the home of Exeter Cricket Club who play in the Tolchards Drinks-sponsored Devon Cricket League. The club has played on the ground since 1902, when it became tenants of Devon CCC. Previously the club's home ground was at Grâs Lawn.

The Devon Dumplings, a wandering club with no fixed abode, has hired the County Ground on a regular basis since its formation in 1902.
