= Alarcão =

Alarcão is a Portuguese surname. Notable people with the surname include:

- Filipe Alarcão (born 1963), Portuguese product designer
- Jorge de Alarcão (born 1934), Portuguese archaeologist
