= Design Management Europe Award =

European design award

- Design Management Europe Award Logo
- Native name: DME Award
- Description: Honoring the strategic use and management of design in business
- Country: Europe (Multiple Partners)
- Presented by: DME Network

The Design Management Europe Award (DME) is a European Design management prize. The DME Award aims to promote the strategic use of design within European businesses. It awards the management and successful implementation of design in their processes and strategies to achieve their business goals. The DME Network consists of 24 partners from 17 countries that have been organizing the DME Award since 2007.

== History ==
DME Award Trophy

=== ADMIRE (Award for Design Management Innovating and Reinforcing Enterprises, January 2007 – February 2009) ===
The DME Award started off as part of the ADMIRE programme in January 2007. The ADMIRE programme was a 2-year project in the European PRO INNO programme of the Directorate-General for Enterprise and Industry of the European Commission. The 6.4 million Euro programme addressed the Innovation management agenda of PRO INNO Europe by raising the awareness of Design Management, in particular amongst European small and medium enterprises, to improve their competitiveness and to boost the European economy in general. It was one of the key project objectives to establish the DME Award. 18 European organisations participated in this programme under the coordination of the City of Eindhoven until the end of the ADMIRE project in February 2009.

=== DME Organisation (February 2009 – Present) ===
The former ADMIRE partners have been organising the DME Award since the end of the funded ADMIRE project on a voluntary basis. The role of these DME partners is to promote and organize the annual DME Award. For this purpose, a DME Award board was elected. The board consists of five representatives from the following organisations:

- Cardiff Metropolitan University
- City of Eindhoven
- European Design Centre
- Design Austria

The costs of the DME Award ceremony are covered by the hosting cities and entering the Award is free for all participants. The entrants are challenged to represent their Design Management processes, strategies and procedures in poster format. These posters are judged by a jury of internationally recognised Design Management experts.

== Judging criteria ==
The DME judging Criteria are:

- Resources : Level of allocated resources
- Awareness of Benefits : Level of added value through design.
- Planning : Plans, objectives and integration of design.
- Process : The process for the use of design.
- Expertise : Level of employment of internal and external expertise.

== Categories ==
=== Current categories ===
Large Company:

- Open to private companies with 250 employees or more or with an annual turnover in excess of €50,000,000

Medium-sized Company:

- Open to private companies with 50 to 249 employees or with an annual turnover not in excess of €50,000,000

Small Company:

- Open to private companies with 10 to 49 employees and with an annual turnover not in excess of €10,000,000

Micro Company:

- Open to private companies with 9 employees or less and with an annual turnover not in excess of €2,000,000

Public or non–profit organisation (NPO):

- Open to public or non–profit organisations such as charities, government programmes, city councils or schools and colleges

Organisations outside of Europe

- Open to any private companies and public or non-profit organisations operating outside of Europe.

=== Previous categories ===
First time design project (2007–2010):

- This category was specific to SMEs (less than 250 employees and a turnover not in excess of €50,000,000). The purpose of this category was to showcase good examples of organisations managing design for the first time. This could have either come from established organisations or from start – ups.

Design strategy for sustainability (2008–2009):

- This category was open to private companies and public organisations of all sizes. Sustainability relates to design strategies encompassing social responsibility, improving the environment or reducing ecological impact.

== DME Award Partners ==
In 2011 the DME Award consortium consisted of the following partners:

Austria	Belgium	Czech Republic	Estonia	France	Germany	Italy
Design Austria	Designregio Kortrijk; Design Flanders	Czech Trade	Eesti Disainerite Liit	Agence pour la Promotion de la Creation Industrielle; Cite du Design	Design Zentrum Nordrhein Westfalen	Associazione per il Disegno Industriale
Luxembourg	Poland	Portugal	Spain	Sweden	The Netherlands	United Kingdom
Design Luxembourg	The Silesian Castle of Art and Enterprise	Centro Portugues de Design	Barcelona Centre Disseny	Stiftelsen Svensk Industridesign	European Design Centre; CBRD/ INHOLLAND; The City of Eindhoven	PDR/ Cardiff Metropolitan University; Centre for Creative Industries

== DME Award Ceremonies ==
- 2007: Essen, Germany
- 2008: Cardiff, United Kingdom
- 2009: Eindhoven, The Netherlands
- 2010: Lisbon, Portugal
- 2011: Tallinn, Estonia
- 2012: Paredes, Portugal

== DME Award Winners ==
Category	2007	2008	2009	2010	2011	2012
Micro Company	Beau & Bien, France; FeONIC, United Kingdom; Ivana Helsinki, Finland	Industreal, Italy; Plusarkkithdit, Finland; Senz Umbrellas, The Netherlands	VanMoof, The Netherlands	No winner Honourable Mention: Puff-Buff, Poland	Viteo Outdoors, Austria	GMG, The Netherlands
Small Company	Dark, Belgium; Extremis, Belgium; T-box, Turkey	Vipp, Denmark; Curana, Belgium; Vacu Vin, The Netherlands	Venrooy Cable Equipment, The Netherlands	Larus, Portugal	Nanimarquina, Spain	Tyromotion, Austria
Medium-sized Company	Walter Knoll, Germany; Chocolat Factory, Spain; Santa & Cole, Spain	Eva Denmark, Denmark; Cifial, Portugal; Thrislington Cubicles, United Kingdom	Royal VKB, Koninklijke Van Kempen & Begeer, The Netherlands, Temahome, Portugal	Figueras International Seating, Spain	Lékué, Spain	Leborgne, France
Large Company	Loewe, Germany; Festo, Germany; BSH Hausgeräte, Germany	Virgin Atlantic, United Kingdom; Kärcher, Germany; Roca, Spain	Trespa, The Netherlands	Zelmer, Poland	Vestel, Turkey	Beiersdorf, Germany
Public or non–profit organisation (NPO)	Escuela de Arte y Superior de Diseño, Spain; d'Stater Museen, Luxembourg; Centrale des Auberges de Jeunesse, Luxembourg	Hogeschool West-Vlaanderen, Belgium; National Patient Safety Agency, United Kingdom; Courtray Design Biennale Interieur, Belgium	MyMachine, Belgium	D4E1-Howest, Belgium	La 27ème region, France	Design Silesia, Poland; Tallinn Transport, Estonia
First time design project	Nlisis, The Netherlands; Madara Cosmetics, Latvia; Eliet, Belgium	Nomad Wheelchairs, United Kingdom	No winner Honourable Mention: Acquaefuoco, Italy; Waar, The Netherlands			
Design strategy for sustainability	EDF, France	Cityroofs, The Netherlands				
New-comer	Justincase Trading, Austria; Bionade, Germany; Moho Design, Poland					
