= Strategic design =

Design principle

Strategic design is the application of future-oriented design principles in order to increase an organization's innovative and competitive qualities. Its foundations lie in the analysis of external and internal trends and data, which enables design decisions to be made on the basis of facts rather than aesthetics or intuition. The discipline is mostly practiced by design agencies or by internal development departments.

== Definition ==
"Traditional definitions of design often focus on creating discrete solutions—be it a product, a building, or a service. Strategic design is about applying some of the principles of traditional design to "big picture" systemic challenges like business growth, health care, education, and climate change. It redefines how problems are approached, identifies opportunities for action, and helps deliver more complete and resilient solutions." The traditional concept of design is mainly associated with artistic work. The addition of the term strategic expands such conception so that creativity is linked with innovation, allowing ideas to become practical and profitable applications "that can be managed effectively, acquired, used and/or consumed by target audiences." Strategic design draws from the body of literature that emerged in recent years, which outlines strategic design principles that provide insights and new methods in the areas of merchandising, consuming, and ownership. There are at least four factors that demonstrate the value of strategic design and these are:

1. it affects consumer behavior through motivation by creating a perceptual value;
2. it offers a way for firms to differentiate their products and services from the competition;
3. it creates meaning, by effectively making the customer understand the product and its value; and,
4. it can be used to manage risks by providing a structure that offers opportunities for collaboration, innovation and the creation of a mechanism to meaningfully address problems.

== Applications ==
Businesses are the main consumers of strategic design, but the public, political and not-for-profit sectors are also making increasing use of the discipline. Its applications are varied, yet often aim to strengthen one of the following: product branding, product development, corporate identity, corporate branding, operating and business models, and service delivery.

Strategic design has become increasingly crucial in recent years, as businesses and organisations compete for a share of today's global and fast-paced marketplace.

"To survive in today’s rapidly changing world, products and services must not only anticipate change, but drive it. Businesses that won’t lose market share to those that do. There have been many examples of strategic design breakthroughs over the years and in an increasingly competitive global market with rapid product cycles, strategic design is becoming more important".

Examples

Strategic design can play a role in helping to resolve the following common problems:

- Identifying the most important questions that a company's products and services should address (Example: John Rheinfrank of Fitch Design showed Kodak that its disposable cameras were not intended to replace traditional cameras, but instead to meet specific needs, like weddings, underwater photography and others)
- Translating insights into actionable solutions (Example: Jump Associates helped Target turn an understanding of college students into a dorm room line designed by Todd Oldham)
- Prioritizing the order in which a portfolio of products and services should be launched (Example: Apple Inc. laid out the iPod+iTunes ecosystem slowly over time, rather than launching all of its pieces at once)
- Connecting design efforts to an organization's business strategy (Example: Hewlett-Packard's global design division is focused most intently on designs that simplify technology experiences. This leads to lower manufacturing costs at a time when CEO Mark Hurd is pushing for cost-cutting.) Mark Hurd discussed HP's design strategy for determining environmental footprint of their supply chain.
- Integrating design as a fundamental aspect of strategic brand intent (Example: Tom Hardy, Design Strategist, developed the core brand-design principle ″Balance of Reason & Feeling″ for Samsung Electronics, together with rational and emotional attributes, to guide design language within a comprehensive brand-design program that inspired differentiation and elevated the company's global image.)

== See also ==
- Experience design
- Design management
- Design methods
- Design thinking
- Industrial design
- Instructional design
- Product design
- Service design
- U.S. Army Strategist
- User-centered design
