= Tim Leberecht =

German-born American marketer

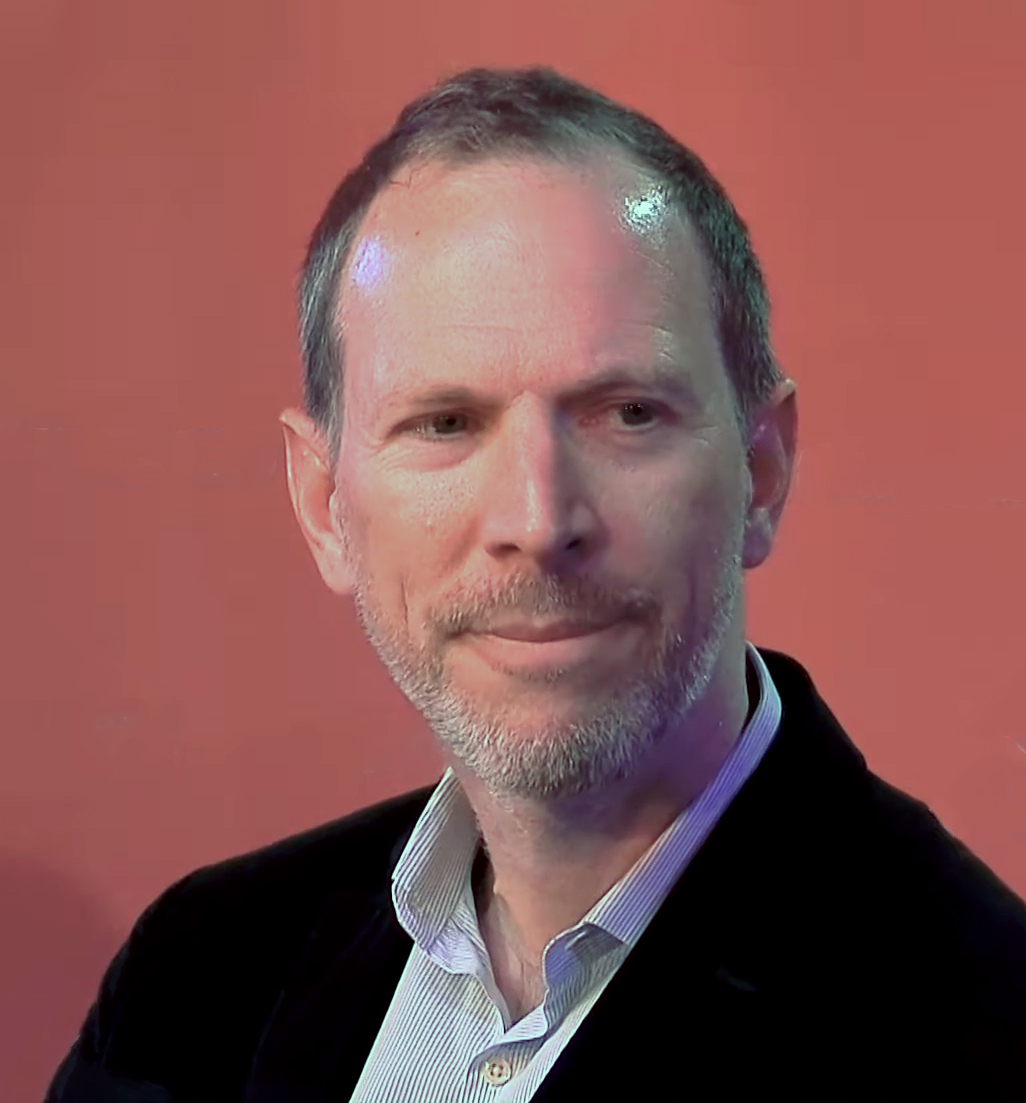
- Born: Germany
- Education: Lüneburg University; University of Southern California
- Employer(s): Leberecht and Partners
- Board member of: Jump Associates
- Website: timleberecht.com

Tim Leberecht is a German-American author, speaker, and consultant. He is the former chief marketing officer of the creative firms Frog Design Inc. (styled as frog) and NBBJ. He now runs his own consulting firm, Leberecht and Partners, and writes and speaks about leadership, technology, and culture. He served on the World Economic Forum's Global Agenda Council on Values from 2012 to 2016, and he is a member of the NationSwell Council as well as an advisory board member for the strategy and innovation consulting firm Jump Associates.

== Early life and education ==
Leberecht was born and raised in Germany. He earned his Master of Arts in Applied Cultural Studies at Lüneburg University and a Master of Arts in communications management at the University of Southern California.

== Career ==
Leberecht was chief marketing officer at the architecture and design firm Frog Design Inc. (styled as frog) from 2006 to 2013, where he also served as chief marketing officer of its parent company Aricent from 2010 to 2012. He was chief marketing officer at the architecture and urban planning firm NBBJ from 2013 to 2015. Prior to joining Frog, Leberecht held marketing positions at the mind mapping and innovation management software company Mindjet, the 2004 Summer Olympics, and Deutsche Telekom. He now runs his own firm, Leberecht and Partners, which he founded in 2015.

Leberecht has hosted innovation workshops for Fortune 500 companies and written about design, leadership, and marketing for Fast Company, Forbes, Fortune, and Wired, among other publications. In 2015, Leberecht published The Business Romantic: Give Everything, Quantify Nothing, and Create Something Greater Than Yourself, which proposes ten principles for finding more enchantment and meaning at work. Forbes included the book in their lists, "15 Books for Creative Leaders to Read in Spring 2015" and "Top 10 Creative Leadership Books of 2015". In addition, Inc. included The Business Romantic in their list of "Top 10 Motivational Books of 2015". Related to the book, Leberecht founded the Business Romantic Society, which has been described as "a global collective of artists, developers, designers and researchers who share the mission of bringing beauty to business".

Leberecht has presented at multiple TED conferences. In 2012, he presented "3 ways to (usefully) lose control of your brand" at "TedGlobal", which Fortune included in their 2016 list of "5 TED Talks Every Business Owner Needs to Watch". He opined about the need to bring romance back to business and engineering in his talk "Let's bring romance back to business" at "TED University 2015". In 2016, he presented "4 ways to build a human company in the age of machines" at "TEDSummit", in which he describes four ways to "create beauty" in business.

Leberecht founded Design Mind magazine and co-founded the dinner series "15 Toasts", which provides "safe spaces for people to have conversations on difficult topics", and is a "connector" for the Experience Institute. He also served on the World Economic Forum's Global Agenda Council on Values from 2012 to 2016. He is a member of the NationSwell Council and an advisory board member for the strategy and innovation consulting firm Jump Associates.

== Migraine ==
Leberecht was a vocalist and guitarist for Migraine, a band formed in Stuttgart, Germany, along with saxophonist Jakob Hesler and bassist Lars Precht. The jazz and pop band released multiple recordings: Little Luxury (1994) on Miramar Records, and Anticipation on Me (1994) and David Shrinks (1997) on Blue Flame Records.

== Bibliography ==
=== Books ===
- The Business Romantic: Give Everything, Quantify Nothing, and Create Something Greater Than Yourself. HarperCollins. January 6, 2015.

== See also ==
- List of TED speakers
