= Design management =

Field of inquiry in business

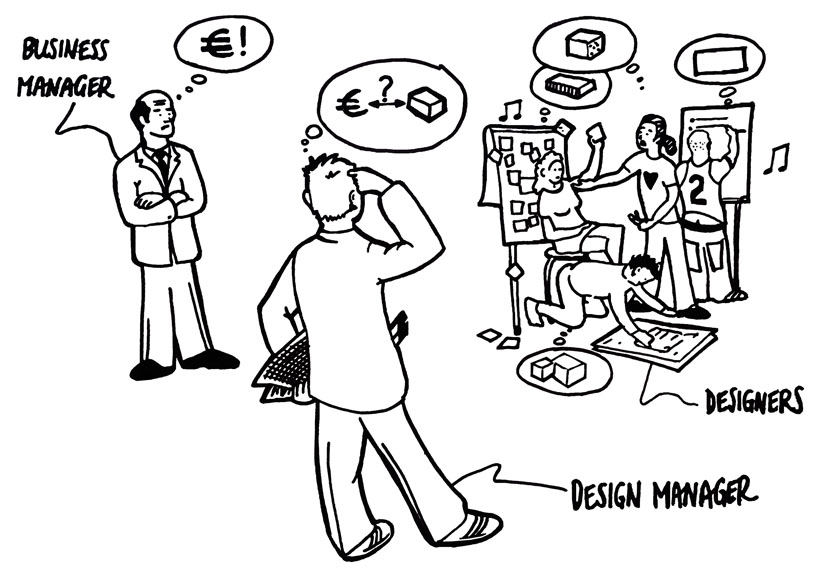
Design management is the business side of design. Design managers need to speak the language of the business and the language of design.

Design management is a field of inquiry that uses design, strategy, project management and supply chain techniques to control a creative process, support a culture of creativity, and build a structure and organization for design. The objective of design management is to develop and maintain an efficient business environment in which an organization can achieve its strategic and mission goals through design. Design management is a comprehensive activity at all levels of business (operational to strategic), from the discovery phase to the execution phase. "Simply put, design management is the business side of design. Design management encompasses the ongoing processes, business decisions, and strategies that enable innovation and create effectively-designed products, services, communications, environments, and brands that enhance our quality of life and provide organizational success." The discipline of design management overlaps with marketing management, operations management, and strategic management.

Traditionally, design management was seen as limited to the management of design projects, but over time, it evolved to include other aspects of an organization at the functional and strategic level. A more recent debate concerns the integration of design thinking into strategic management as a cross-disciplinary and human-centered approach to management. This paradigm also focuses on a collaborative and iterative style of work and an abductive mode of inference, compared to practices associated with the more traditional management paradigm.

Design is a strategic asset in brand equity, differentiation, and product quality for many companies. Organizations apply design management to improve design-relevant activities and to better connect design with corporate strategy.

== Extended definition ==
Design management plays three integrative key roles in the interface of design, organization and market.

The multifaceted nature of design management leads to varied opinion, making it difficult to give an overall definition; furthermore, design managers have a broad range of roles and responsibilities. These factors, combined with a multitude of other influences such as the industry involved, company size, the market situation, and the importance of design within the organization's activities. As a result, design management is not restricted to a single design discipline and usually depends on the context of its application within an individual organization.

On an abstract level, design management plays three key roles at the interface of design, organization, and the market. These three key roles are to:

1. Align design strategy with corporate or brand strategy, or both
2. Manage quality and consistency of design outcomes across and within different design disciplines (design classes)
3. Enhance new methods of user experience, create new solutions for user needs and differentiation from competitor's designs

=== Additional definitions ===
Design management is the effective deployment by line managers of the design resources available to an organization in the pursuance of its corporate objectives. It is therefore directly concerned with the organizational place of design, with the identification with specific design disciplines which are relevant to the resolution of key management issues, and with the training of managers to use design effectively.

— Peter Gorb

Design management is a complex and multi-faceted activity that goes right to the heart of what a company is or does [...] it is not something susceptible to pat formulas, a few bullet points or a manual. Every company's structure and internal culture is different; design management is no exception. But the fact that every firm is different does not diminish the importance of managing design tightly and effectively.

— John Thackara

== Definition of related terms ==
=== Design ===
Unlike unique sciences such as mathematics, the perspective, activity, or discipline of design is not brought to a generally accepted common denominator. The historical beginnings of design are complex and the nature of design is still the subject of ongoing discussion. In design, there are strong differentiations between theory and practice. The fluid nature of the theory allows the designer to operate without being constrained by a rigid structure. In practice, decisions are often referred to as intuition. In his Classification of Design (1976), Gorb divided design into three different classes. Design management operates in and across all three classes: product (e.g. industrial design, packaging design, service design), information (e.g. graphic design, branding, media design, web design), and environment (e.g. retail design, exhibition design, interior design).

=== Management ===
Management in all business and organizational activities is the act of getting people together to accomplish desired goals and objectives efficiently and effectively. Management comprises planning, organizing, staffing, leading or directing, and controlling an organization (a group of one or more people or entities), or effort for the purpose of accomplishing a goal. (Note: Henri Fayol (1841–1925) considers management to consist of six functions: forecasting, planning, organizing, commanding, coordinating, and controlling. He was one of the most influential contributors to modern concepts of management. (see Administration industrielle et générale - prévoyance organization - commandment, coordination – contrôle, Paris: Dunod, 1966)) Resourcing encompasses the deployment and manipulation of human resources, financial resources, technological resources, and natural resources. Towards the end of the 20th century, business management came to consist of six separate branches, namely human resource management, operations management (or production management), strategic management, marketing management, financial management, and information technology management, which was responsible for management information systems. Although it is difficult to subdivide management into functional categories in this way, it helps in navigating the discipline of management. Design management overlaps mainly with the branches marketing management, operations management, and strategic management.

=== Design leadership ===
Design managers often operate in the area of design leadership; however, design management and design leadership are interdependent rather than interchangeable. Like management and leadership, they differ in their objectives, achievements of objectives, accomplishments, and outcomes. Design leadership leads from creation of a vision to changes, innovations, and implementation of creative solutions. It stimulates communication and collaboration through motivation, sets ambitions, and points out future directions to achieve long-term objectives. In contrast, design management could be regarded as reactive and responds to a given business situation by using specific skills, tools, methods, and techniques. However, design management can also be viewed from proactive and creative perspectives as found in research (see e.g. the research anthology «Management of Design alliances», eds Bruce & Jevnaker). Design management requires design leadership to know where to go and design leadership requires design management to know how to get there.

== History ==
Difficulties arise in tracing the history of design management. Even though design management as an expression is first mentioned in literature in 1964, earlier contributions created the context in which the expression could arise. Throughout its history, design management was influenced by a number of different disciplines: architecture, industrial design, management, software development, engineering; and movements such as system theory, design methodologies. It cannot be attributed directly to either design or to management.

=== Business ===
==== Managing product aesthetics and corporate design (early contributions) ====
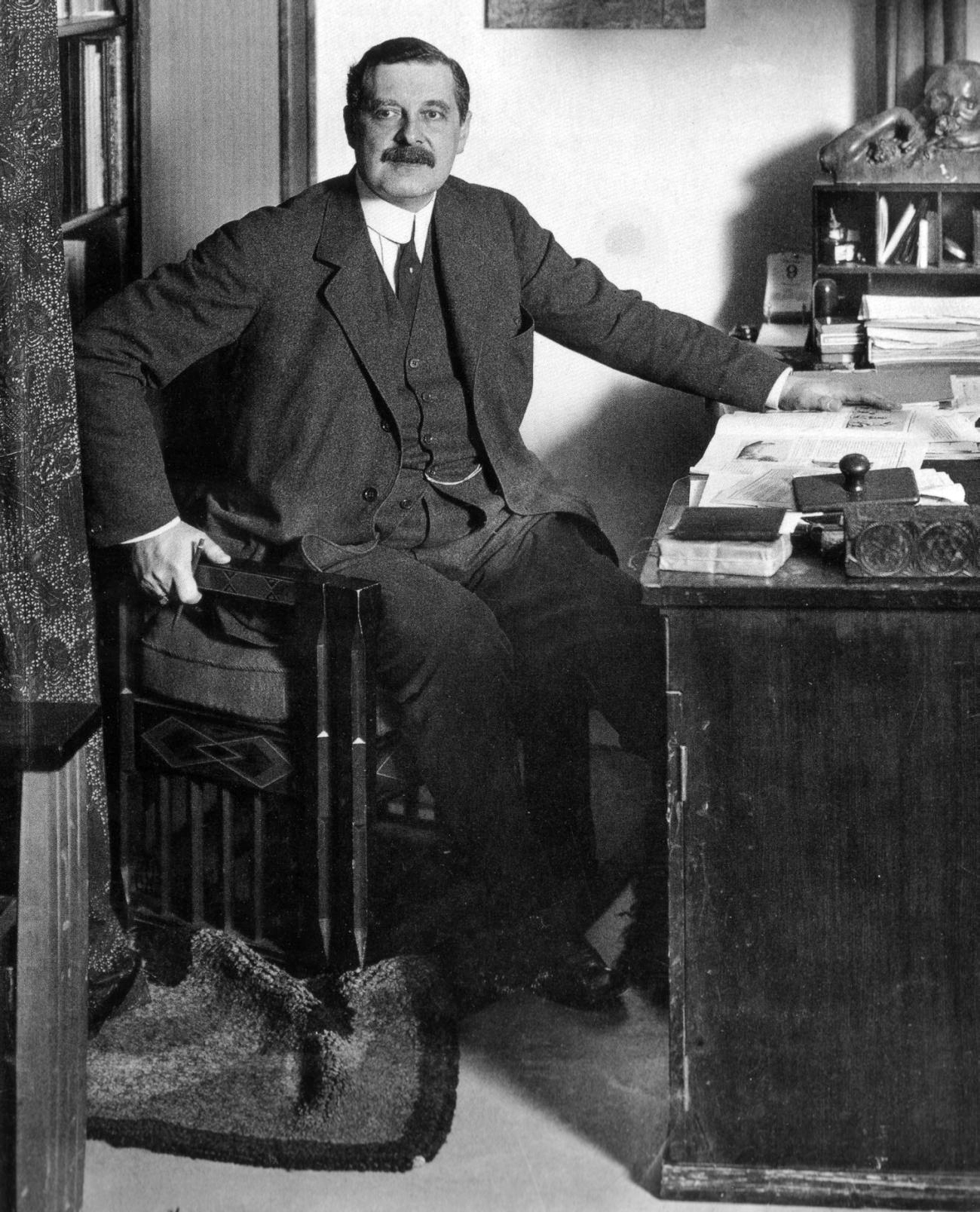
Peter Behrens, around 1913 in his office in Berlin, was one of the first contributors to design management.

Early contributions to design management show how different design disciplines were coordinated to achieve business objectives at a corporate level, and demonstrate the early understanding of design as a competitive force. In that context, design was merely understood as an aesthetic function, and the management of design was at the level of project planning.

The practice of managing design to achieve a business objective was first documented in 1907. The Deutscher Werkbund (German Work Federation) was established in Munich by twelve architects and twelve business firms as a state-sponsored effort to better compete with Great Britain and the United States by integrating traditional craft and industrial mass-production techniques. A German designer and architect, Peter Behrens, created the entire corporate identity (logotype, product design, marketing communications, company building architecture, etc.) of Allgemeine Elektrizitäts Gesellschaft (AEG), and is regarded as the first corporate design management leader in history. His work for AEG was the first large-scale demonstration of the viability and vitality of the Werkbund's initiatives and objectives and can be considered as first contribution to design management.

In the following years, companies applied the principles of corporate identity and corporate design to increase awareness and recognition by consumers and differentiation from competitors. Olivetti became famous for its attention to design through their corporate design activities. In 1936 Olivetti hired Giovanni Pintori in their publicity department and promoted Marcello Nizzoli from the product design department to develop design in a comprehensive corporate philosophy. In 1956, inspired by the compelling brand character of Olivetti, Thomas Watson, Jr., CEO of IBM, retained American architect and industrial designer Eliot Noyes to develop a corporate-wide IBM Design Program consisting of coherent brand-design strategy together with a design management system to guide and oversee the comprehensive brand identity elements of: products, graphics, exhibits, architecture, interiors and fine art. This seminal effort by Noyes, with his inclusion of Paul Rand and Charles Eames as consultants, is considered to be the first comprehensive corporate design program in America. Up to and during the 1960s, debates in the design community were focused on ergonomics, functionalism, and corporate design, while debates in management addressed Just in time, Total quality management, and product specification. The main proponents of design management at that time were AEG, Bauhaus, HfG Ulm, the British Design Council, Deutscher Werkbund, Olivetti, IBM, Peter Behrens, and Walter Paepcke.

==== Managing design systematically (1960s–1970s) ====
The work of designers in the 1960s was influenced by industry, as the debate on design evolved from an aesthetic function into active cooperation with industry. Designers had to work in a team with engineers and marketers, and design was perceived as one part of the product development process. In the early years, design management was strongly influenced by system science and the emergence of a design science (e.g. the "blooming period of design methodologies" in Germany, the US, and Great Britain), as its main contributors had backgrounds in architecture. Early discussions on design management were strongly influenced by Anglo-Saxon literature (e.g. Farr and Horst Rittel), methodological studies in Design Research (e.g. HfG Ulm and Christopher Alexander), and theories in business studies. Design management dealt with two main issues:

- how to develop corporate systems of planning aims
- how to solve problems of methodological information processing

Instruments and checklists were developed to structure the processes and decisions of companies for successful corporate development. In this period the main contributors to design management were Michael Farr, Horst Rittel, HfG Ulm, Christopher Alexander, James Pilditch, the London Business School, Peter Gorb, the Design Management Institute, and the Royal Society of Arts. Debates in design disciplines were focusing on design science, design methodology, wicked problems, (Note: "Wicked problem" is a phrase originally used in social planning to describe a problem that is difficult or impossible to solve because of incomplete, contradictory, and changing requirements that are often difficult to recognize. Moreover, because of complex interdependencies, the effort to solve one aspect of a wicked problem may reveal or create other problems.) Ulm methodology, the relationship of design and business, new German design, and semiotic and scenario technique.

==== Managing design as a strategic asset (1980s–1990s) ====
In the 1980s several managers realized the economic effect of design, which increased the demand for design management. As companies were unsure how to manage design, there was a market for consultancy; focusing on helping organizations manage the product development process, including market research, product concepts, projects, communications, and market launch phases—as well as the positioning of products and companies.

Three important works were published in 1990: the Publication of Design Management – A Handbook of Issues and Methods by Mark Oakley (Editor), the book Design Management by French researcher Brigitte Borja de Mozota, and the Publication of Design Management – Papers from the London Business School by Peter Gorb (Editor). This new method-based design management approach helped to improve communication amongst technical and marketing managers. Examples of the new methods included trend research, the product effect triad, style mapping, milieus, product screenings, empiric design methods, and service design, giving design a more communicative and central role within organizations. Dr David Hands developed many of these themes in his seminal textbook 'Design Management: an essential handbook, 2017, published by Kogan Page.

In the management community, the topics of management theory, positioning strategy, brand management, strategic management, advertising, competitive strategy, leadership, business ethics, mass customization, core competencies, strategic intent, reputation management, and systems theory were discussed. The main issues and debates in design management included the topics of design leadership, design thinking, and corporate identity, as well as the involvement of design management at the operational, tactical, and strategic levels.

In 1980 Robert Blaich, the senior managing director of design at Philips, introduced a design management system that regards design, production, and marketing as a single unit. This was an important contribution to the definition of design as a core element in business. At Philips Design, Stefano Marzano became CEO and Chief Creative Director in 1991, continuing the work of Robert Blaich to align design processes with business processes and furthering design strategy as an important asset of the overall business strategy.

Upon being appointed corporate head of the IBM Design Program in 1989, Tom Hardy, initiated a strategic design management effort, in collaboration with IBM design consultant Richard Sapper, to return to the roots of the IBM Design Program first established in 1956 by Eliot Noyes, Paul Rand and Charles Eames. The intent was to reprise IBM's brand image with customer experience-driven quality, approachability and contemporary product innovation. The highly successful IBM ThinkPad was the first product to emerge from this strategy in 1992 and, together with other innovative, award-winning products that followed, served to position design as a strategic asset for IBM's brand turnaround efforts initiated in 1993 by newly appointed CEO Louis V. Gerstner, Jr.

As a consultant following his 22-year tenure at IBM, Hardy served as Corporate Design Advisor to Samsung from 1996 to 2003 where his introduction of a new brand-design ethos and guiding principles, together with a comprehensive design management system, became a strategic corporate asset that significantly helped elevate Samsung's image from follower to global brand-design leader and dramatically increased brand equity value.

==== Managing design for innovation (2000s–2010s) ====
Design management has taken a more strategic role within business since 2000, and more academic programs for design management have been established. Design management has been recognized (and subsidized) throughout the European Union as a function for corporate advantage of both companies and nations. (Note: The highest awareness in the design management community got the Pro Inno Europe initiative (the EU's "focal point for innovation policy analysis, learning and development"), because it funded the ADMIRE (Award for Design Management Innovating and Reinforcing Enterprises) project. The goal of the project was to stimulate companies to invest in design management and use it as a key driver for innovation and competitiveness (e.g. through the Design Management Award, the DME library and the DME self-assessment tool).) The main issues and debates included the topics of design thinking, strategic design management, design leadership, and product service systems. Design management was influenced by the following design trends: sustainable design, inclusive design, interactive design, design probes, product clinics, and co-design. It was also influenced by the later management trends of open innovation and design thinking.

=== Notion of the term "design management" ===
In 1965 the term design management was first published in a series of articles in the Design Journal. This series includes a pre-publication of the first chapter of the book Design Management by Michael Farr, which is considered as the first comprehensive literature on design management. His thoughts on system theory and project management led to a framework on how to deal with design as a business function at the corporate management level by providing the language and methodology to effectively manage it.

The term "architectural management" was coined by the architects Brunton, Baden Hellard and Boobyer in 1964 where they highlighted the tension and synergy between the management of individual projects (job management) and the management of the business (office management). Although they did not use the term "design management", they stressed identical issues; while the design community discussed methodologies for design. Christopher Alexander's work played an important role in the development of the design methodology, where he devoted his attention to the problems of form and context; and focused on disassembling complex design challenges into constituent parts to approach a solution. His intention was to bring more rationalism and structure into the solving of design problems.

=== Design policy ===
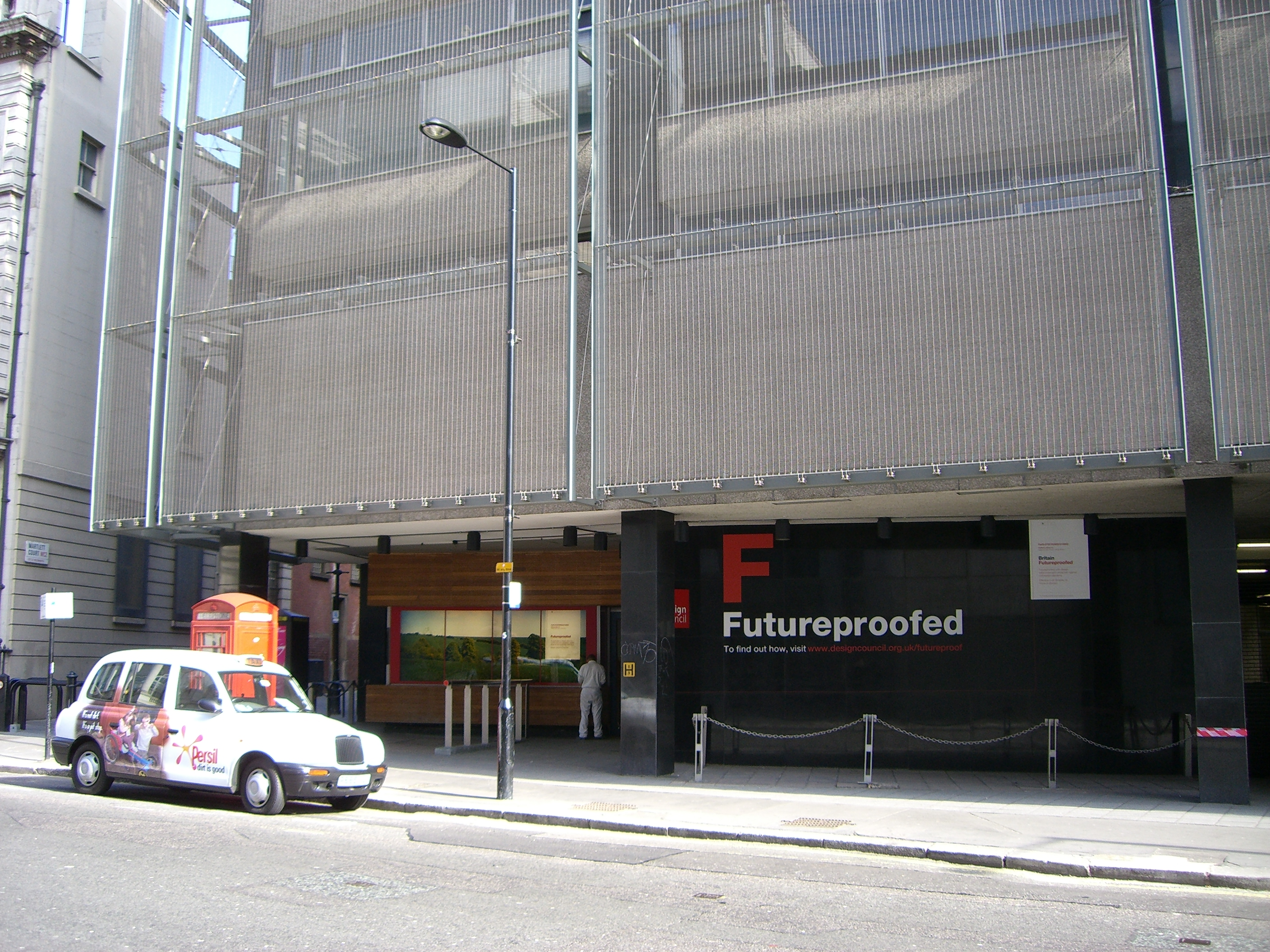
The British Design Council was founded in 1944 to promote design in the British industry.

Design policies have a history reaching back to the end of the 19th century, when design programs with roots in the crafts sector were implemented in Sweden (1845) and Finland (1875). In 1907 the Deutscher Werkbund (German Work Federation) was established in Munich to better compete with Great Britain and United States. The success of the Deutscher Werkbund inspired a group of British designers, industrialists and business people after they had seen the Werkbund Exhibition in Cologne in 1914, to found the Design and Industries Association and campaign for a greater involvement of government in the promotion of good design. In 1944 design management by managing design policies was used by the British Government. The British Design Council was founded by Hugh Dalton, president of the Board of Trade in the British wartime government, as the Council of Industrial Design with the objective "to promote by all practicable means the improvement of design in the products of British industry".

Germany also realized the national importance of design during World War II. Between 1933 and 1945 Adolf Hitler used design, architecture and propaganda to increase his power; shown through the annual Reichsparteitage in Nürnberg on September 5. Heinrich Himmler coordinated several design activities for Hitler, including: the all-black SS-uniform designed by Professor Karl Diebitsch and Walter Heck in 1933; the Dachau concentration camp, designed by Theodor Eicke, and prototypes for other Nazi concentration camps; and the Wewelsburg redesign commissioned by Heinrich Himmler in 1944.

Since the 1990s the practice of design promotion evolved, and governments have used policy management and design management to promote design as part of their efforts of fostering technology, manufacturing and innovation.

Today, most developed countries have some kind of design promotion programme. The Design Management Institute has dedicated three issues to design policy development. Although initiatives promote design in different complexities, scopes and focuses, specific targets tend to address the following objectives:

- support business: increase use of design by companies, particularly by small and medium enterprises (SMEs), and grow the design sector (use dimension);
- promote to the public: increase exports of design and attract international investment (international dimension);
- educate designers: improve design education and research (academic dimension).

A very comprehensive analysis on the situation of design on national level in the UK is the Cox review. The then chairman of the Design Council, Sir George Cox, published the Cox Review of Creativity in Business in 2005 to communicate the competitive advantage of design for the British industry.

Innovation policies have been excessively focused on the supply of technologies, neglecting the demand side (the user). There have been several initiatives by the European Commission to support and research design and design management in recent years. However, a European-wide policy to support design has never been planned, due to the inconsistencies and differences in design policies in each nation. (Note: In 2004, a representative of the EU intimated that there will never be a design policy at European level pursued by the EU, until the national policies become more effective and consistent across Europe (January 2004, on the APCI conference in Paris)) Nonetheless, there are currently plans to include design in the EU innovation policy.

=== Promotion of Design Management ===
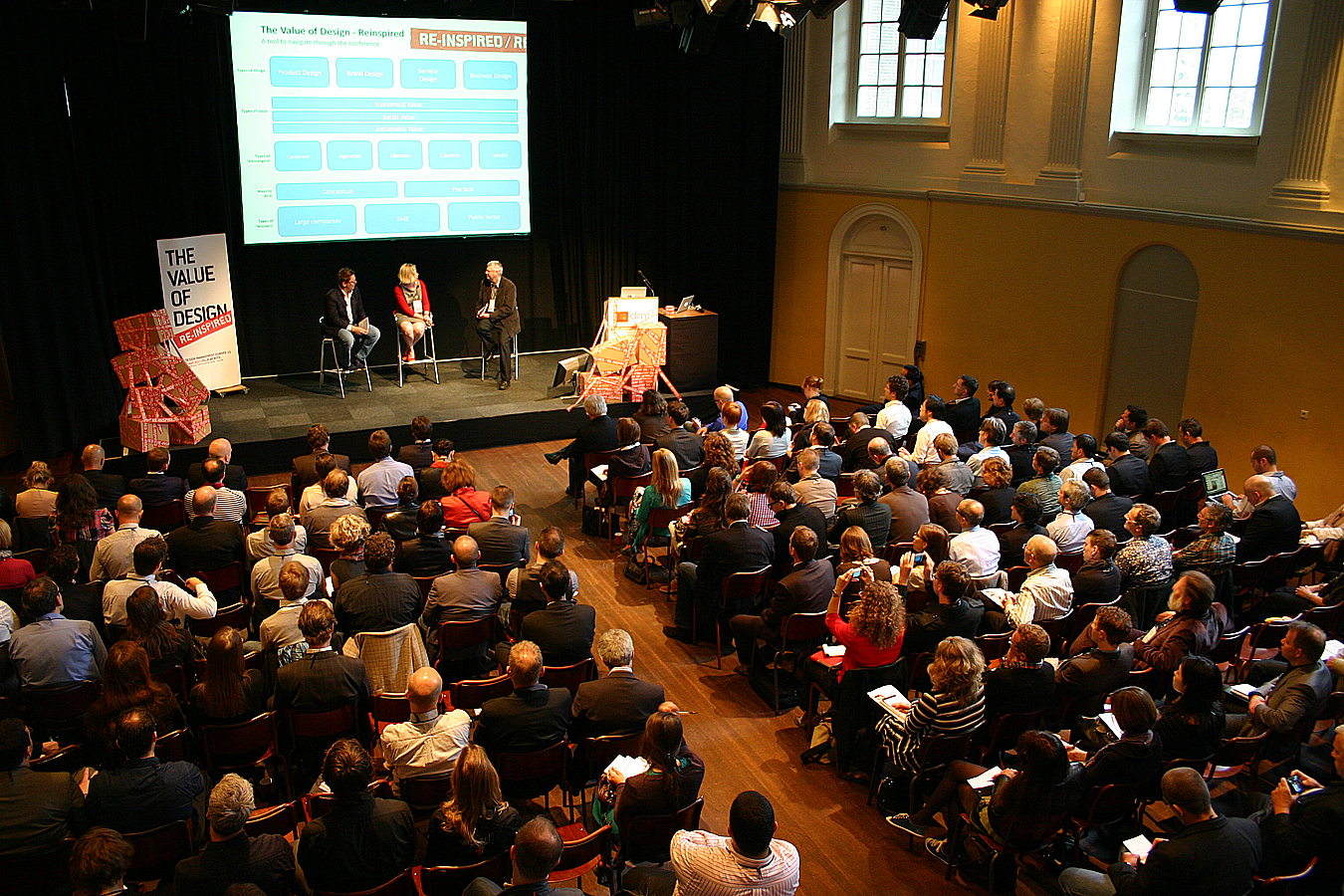
The 15th European International Design Management Conference organized by the Design Management Institute

In America the Chicago industrialist Walter Paepcke, of the Container Corporation of America, founded the Aspen Design Conference after World War II as a way of bringing business and designers together – to the benefit of both. In 1951 the first conference topic, "Design as a function of management", was chosen to ensure the participation of the business community. After several years, business leaders stopped attending because the increased participation of designers changed the dialogue, focusing not on the need for collaboration between business and design, but rather on the business community's failure to understand the value of design.

The Royal Society of Arts (RSA) Presidential Medals for Design Management were instituted in June 1964. These were to recognize outstanding examples of design policy in organizations that maintained a consistently high standard in all aspects of design management, throughout all industries and disciplines. With these awards the RSA introduced the term design management. In 1965 the first medals were given to four companies; Conran & Co Ltd, Jaeger & Co Ltd, S. Hille & Co Ltd and W. & A. Gilbey Ltd. in the category "current achievements" and two companies London Transport (Note: With the award [...] London Transport's position as the first great commercial organisation to think of design as a major factor involving all its activities has at last been formally recognised.) and Heal and Son Ltd. (Note: This article discusses the evolution of Heal's from its beginnings as a small firm to its present position as a large store with a high reputation.) in the category "long pioneering in the field of design management". The medal selection committee included representatives of the RSA council and the faculty of Royal Designers for Industry.

The Design Management Institute (DMI) was founded in 1975 at the Massachusetts College of Art in Boston. Since the mid-1980s the DMI has been an international non-profit organization that seeks to heighten the awareness of design as an essential part of business strategy, and become the leading resource and international authority on design management. One year later the first conference was organized. The DMI increased its international presence and established the "European International Conference on Design Management" in 1997, and a professional development program for design management.

In 2007 the European Commission funded the Award for Design Management Innovating and Reinforcing Enterprises (ADMIRE) project for two years, as part of the Pro Inno Europe Initiative, which is the EU's "focal point for innovation policy analysis, learning and development". The aim was to encourage companies – especially small and medium enterprises (SMEs) – to introduce design management procedures to; improve their competitiveness, stimulate innovation, establish a European knowledge-sharing platform, organize the Design Management Europe Award, and to identify and test new activities to promote Design Management.

=== Education ===
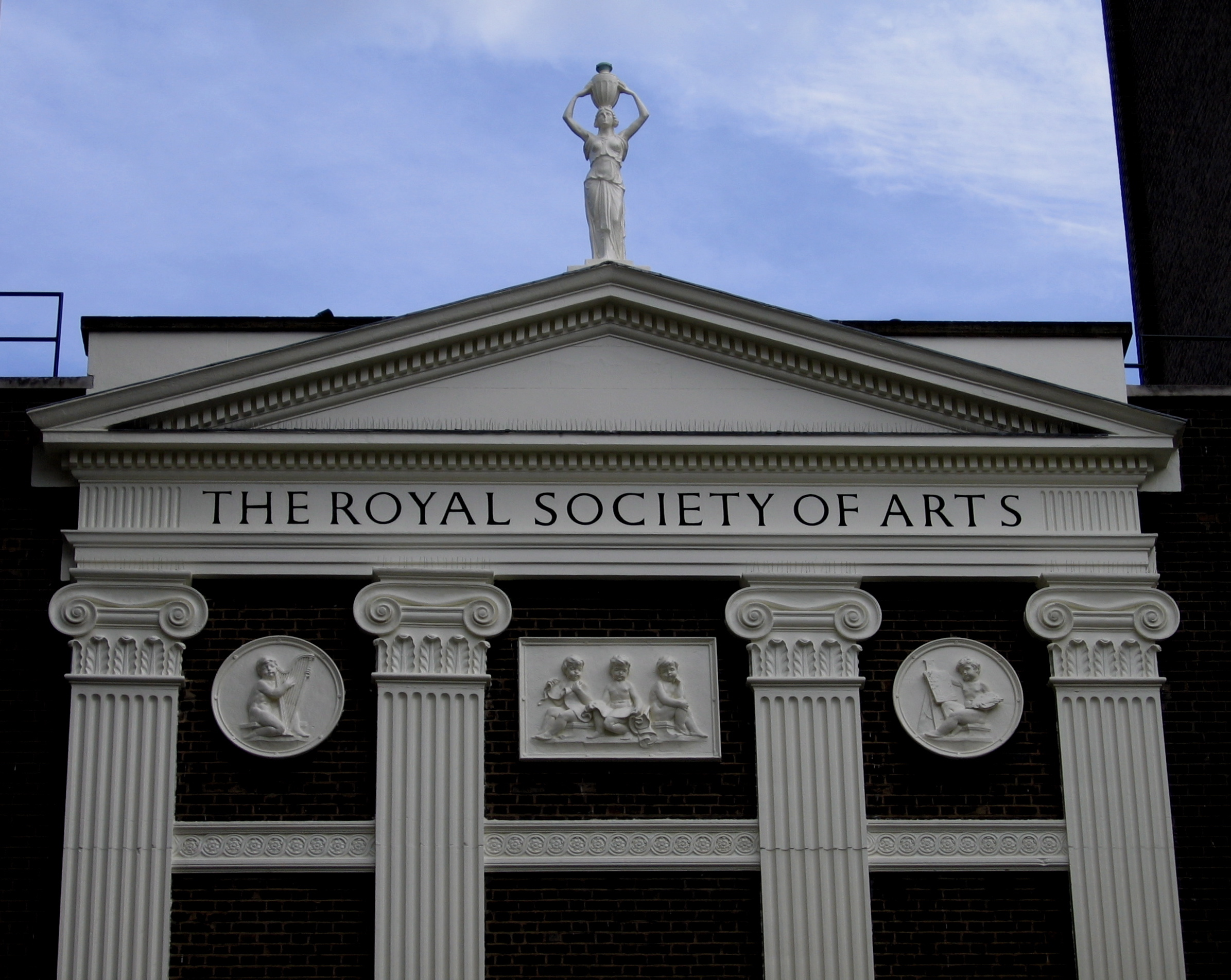
The Royal Society of Arts in London is one of the first institutions supporting design management.

Teaching design to managers was pioneered at the London Business School (LBS) in 1976 by Peter Gorb (1926-2013), the first Honorary Fellow of the DMI and a long-standing Fellow of the RSA. Gorb had previously embedded design management in the Burton Retail Group before joining LBS where he later founded the Design Management Unit in 1982 (in collaboration with Charles Handy) which he led for over 20 years. In 1979 his talk at the RSA entitled Design and its Use by Managers provided a background introduction to the wide scope of design within industry and commerce, an appreciation of the power of design as a management resource, and advocated the teaching of design to managers. Gorb produced two books based on seminars at the Design Management Unit at LBS, Design Talks (1988) with Eric Schneider and Design Management: Papers from the London Business School (1990). Gorb is also remembered as introducing the concept of Silent Design, design undertaken by non-designers, in an influential paper with Angela Dumas (1987).

While design management had its origins in business schools, it has increasingly become embedded in the curriculum in design schools, particularly at the postgraduate level. The first design management programmes at design schools were started in the UK in the 1980s at the Royal College of Art, and De Montfort, Middlesex and Staffordshire Universities. Although some of these design management courses have not been sustainable, other postgraduate courses have flourished including ones at Brunel, Lancaster that was developed and managed under the visionary leadership of Dr David Hands and more recently the University of the Arts with each providing a specific point of view on design management. The Design Leadership Fellowship at the University of Oxford was founded in 2005.

In Europe, the University of Art and Design Helsinki founded the Institute of Design Leadership and Management and established an international training program in 1991. The International Design Management Conference was organised in the same year by them. (Note: 2nd conference in 1992: "Qualities of success", 3rd conference in 1995: "The challenge of complexity") In 1995 the Helsinki School of Economics (HSE), University of Art and Design Helsinki (TaiK), and Helsinki University of Technology (TKK) cooperated to create the International Design Business Management Program (IDBM), which aims to bring together experts from different fields within the concept of design business management. The Finnish Aalto University was founded in 2010 and is a merger of the three established Finnish universities – the Helsinki School of Economics (HSE), University of Art and Design Helsinki (TaiK), and University of Technology (TKK) – that had been cooperating on the IDBM design management program since 1995. Since 2006 the Lucerne University of Applied Sciences and Arts in Switzerland offers one of the few undergraduate studies in design management, completely taught in English.

In the United States, the Hasso Plattner Institute of Design at Stanford University founded the D-school in 2005, a faculty intended to advance multidisciplinary innovation. Design schools in the United States are now offering graduate degrees in Design Management that focus on bridging the disciplines of design and business to lead organisations in the process of design thinking to create meaningful, human-centric value and business success through innovation. Among those offering M.A and M.F.A programs are:

- Savannah College of Art and Design
- Pratt Institute
- University of Kansas
- The New School

Design management education is also gaining importance in other countries, and awareness of the role of design in business is increasing. In India, over the last decade, some of the leading design schools have been offering master's programs.

- MIT Institute of Design Pune - Master of Design in Design Management
- National Institute of Design- Strategic Design Management
- WE School - Business Design
- ISDI- Strategic Design Management
- World University of Design

BusinessWeek annually publishes a lists of the best programmes that combine design thinking and business thinking (D-schools 2009 and D-school Programmes to Watch 2009). The article Finland – World´s Innovation Hot Spot in the Harvard Business Review shows the interest of business leaders in the blended education of design and management. Business Schools (such as the Rotman School of Management, Wharton University of Pennsylvania and MIT Sloan Executive Education) have acted on this interest and developed new academic curricula.

Integrated education models are emerging in the academic world, a model which is referred to as T-shape and π-shaped education. T-shaped professionals are taught general knowledge in a few disciplines (e.g. management and engineering) and specific, deep knowledge in a single domain (e.g. design). This model also applies to companies, when they shift their focus from small T innovations (innovations involving only one discipline, like chemists) to big T innovations (innovations involving several disciplines, like design, ethnography, lead user, etc.). Like in education, this shift makes breaking down silos of departments and disciplines of knowledge essential.

In Switzerland, The Lucerne University of Applied Sciences and Arts (HSLU), which was founded in 1997, offers an undergraduate degree programme in Design Management (DMI), within the School of Design, Film and Art. The programme examines the interrelationship between design, management, and communication within organizational and societal frameworks, with a strong focus on international and interdisciplinary perspectives.

=== Research ===
The first international research project on design management, the TRIAD research project, was initiated by Earl Powell, then president of DMI and the Harvard Business School in 1989. In the same year Earl Powell and Thomas Walton, Ph.D. developed the Design Management Review and DMI published the first issue. The publication is solely focusing on design management and has become the flagship publication of the discipline.

Design and design management have experienced different generations of theories. In its first generation design focused on the object, in the second on the process, and in the third on the user. Similar shifts can be seen in management and design management in almost parallel steps. For design management this has been illustrated by Brigitte Borja de Mozota, using Findeli's Bremen Model as a framework. Design management research organised itself into:

- Organisational studies: design in an economic sector (Note: Design research is done via organisational studies, like design in an economic sector. Following references proof this argument: Hetzel, Patrick. 1993. "Design management et constitution de l'offre", Thése Doctorat Sciences de Gestion, Université Jean Moulin Lyon 3.; Evans, Bill. 1985. "Japanese-Style Management, Product Design and Corporate Strategy", Design Studies, vol. 6, no. 1, January, 25–32.; Brun, Monique. 1994. "Pratiques de création de packagings pour le marché européen: Le cas du secteur alimentaire", Sixth International Forum on Design Management Research & Education, Paris.) or design in large firms, such as Philips or Olivetti (Note: Design research is done via organisational studies, like research on design in large firms, such as Philips or Olivetti. Following references proof this argument: Heskett, John. 1989. Philips, Trefoil Publications, London.; Kicherer, S. 1990. Olivetti: A Study of the Corporate Management of Design, Trefoil Publications.)
- Descriptive studies of specific methods of design management (Note: Design research is done via descriptive studies of specific methods of design management. Following references proof this argument: Topalian, Alan. 1980. The Management of Design Projects. Associated Business Press.; Oakley, Mark (1984). Managing Product Design. London: Littlehampton Book Services Ltd. pp. 8ff. ISBN 978-0-297-78442-5.; Vitrac, Jean-Pierre. 1994. Comment gagner de nouveaux marchés par le design industriel, Paris, Editions l'Usine Nouvelle.; Oakley, Ed. 1990. Design Management: A Handbook of Issues and Methods, Oxford: Basil Blackwell.; Hollins, Gillian, and Bill Hollins. 1991. Total Design: Managing the Design Process in the Service Sector, London, Pitman.; Bauhain–Roux, Dominique. 1992. Gestion du Design et Management d'Entreprise, Chotard.; Blaich, Robert, and Janet Blaich. 1993, Product Design and Corporate Strategy: Managing the Connection for Competitive Advantage, New York: McGraw-Hill.; Cooper, Rachel, and Mike Press. 1995. The Design Agenda, John Wiley & Sons.)

It is difficult to predict where design management research is heading.

== Different types ==
Different types of design management depend on the type and strategic orientation of the business.

=== Product design management ===
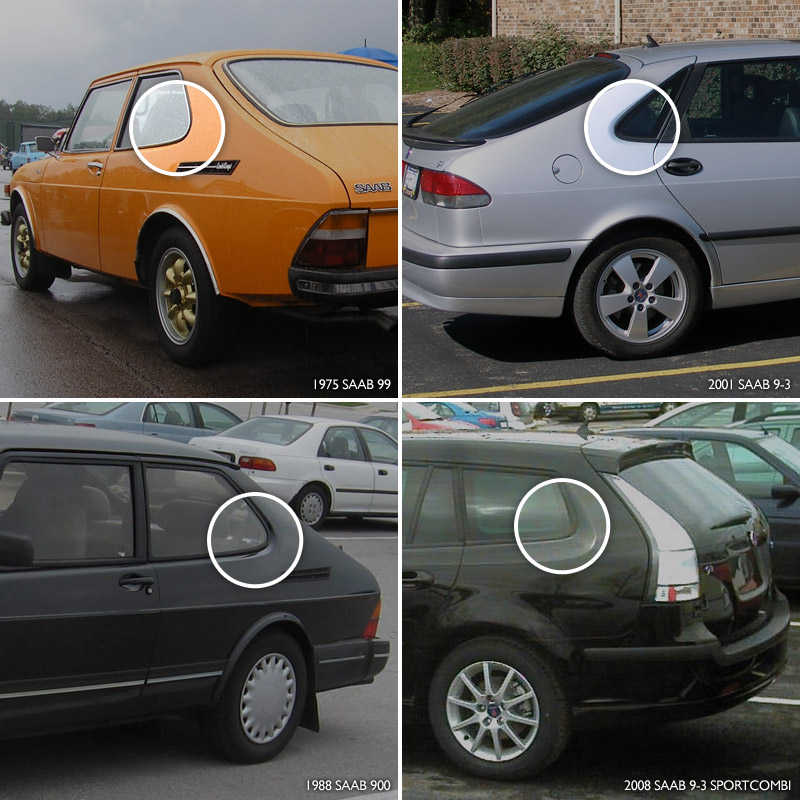
Product design management helps to create a distinctive design. The Saab hockey stick is an automotive design feature.

In product-focused companies, design management focuses mainly on product design management, including strong interactions with product design, product marketing, research and development, and new product development. This perspective of design management is mainly focused on the aesthetic, semiotic, and ergonomic aspects of the product to express the product's qualities and to manage diverse product groups and product design platforms and can be applied together with a user-centered design perspective.

=== Brand design management ===
In market and brand focused companies, design management focuses mainly on brand design management, including corporate brand management and product brand management. Focusing on the brand as the core for design decisions results in a strong focus on the brand experience, customer touch points, reliability, recognition, and trust relations. The design is driven by the brand vision and strategy.

Corporate brand design management

Market and brand focused organizations are concerned with the expression and perception of the corporate brand. Corporate design management implements, develops, and maintains the corporate identity, or brand. This type of brand management is strongly anchored in the organization to control and influence corporate design activities. The design program plays the role of a quality program within many fields of the organization to achieve uniform internal branding. It is strongly linked to strategy, corporate culture, product development, marketing, organizational structure, and technological development. Achieving a consistent corporate brand requires the involvement of designers and a widespread design awareness among employees. A creative culture, knowledge sharing processes, determination, design leadership, and good work relations support the work of corporate brand management.

Product brand design management

The main focus of product brand management lies on the single product or product family. Product design management is linked to research and development, marketing, and brand management, and is present in the fast-moving consumer goods (FMCG) industry. It is responsible for the visual expressions of the individual product brand, with its diverse customer–brand touch points and the execution of the brand through design.

=== Service design management ===
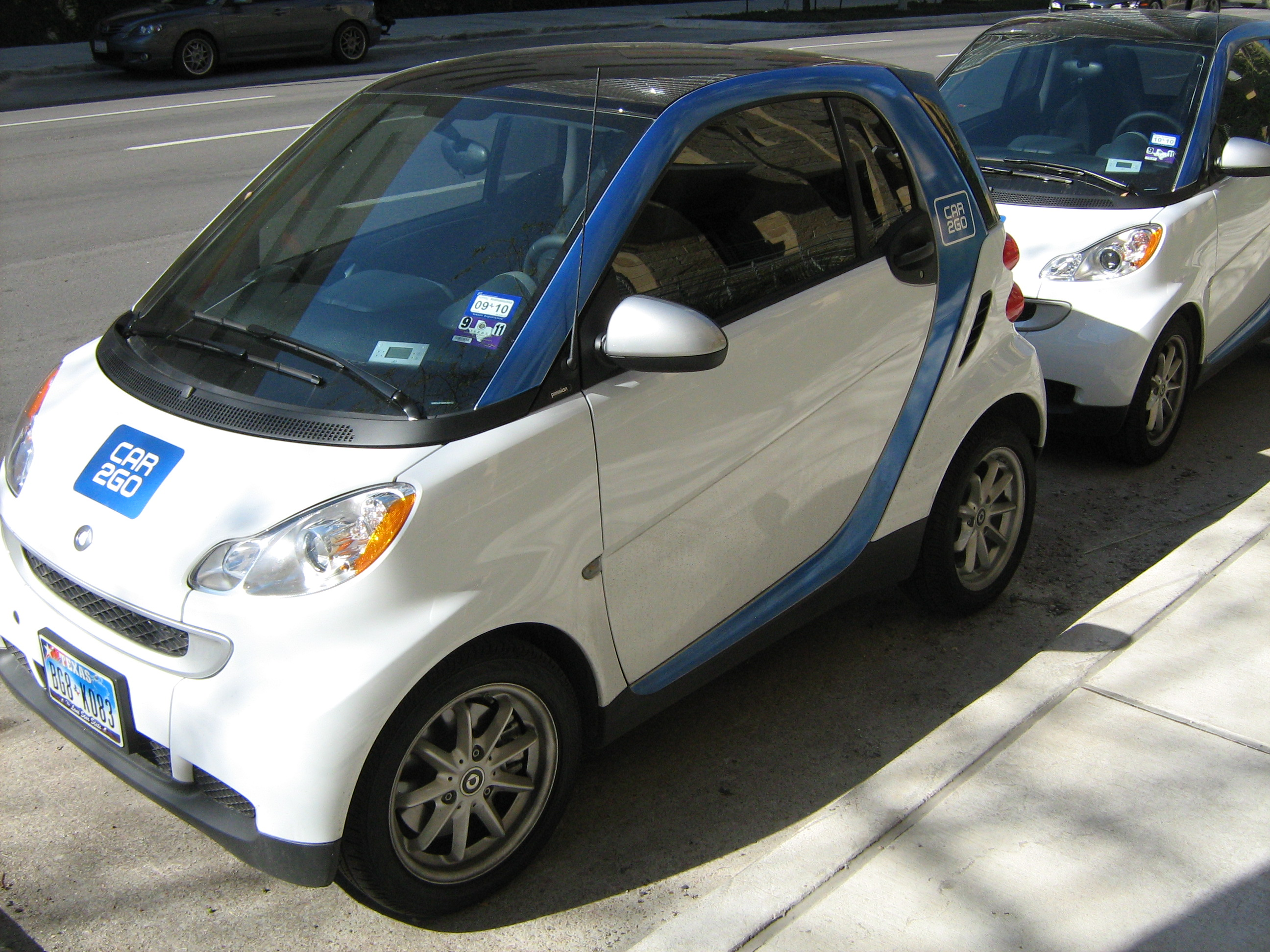
Service design management deals with the newly emerging discipline of service design. An example is the Car2Go concept from Daimler AG, as seen in Austin, Texas.

Service design management deals with the newly emerging field of service design. It is the activity of planning and organizing people, infrastructure, communication, and material components of a service. The aim is to improve the quality of the service, the interaction between the service provider and its customers, and the customer's experience. The increasing importance and size of the service sector in terms of people employed and economic importance requires that services should be well-designed in order to remain competitive and to continue to attract customers. Design management traditionally focuses in the design and development of manufactured products; service design managers can apply many of the same theoretical and methodological approaches. Systematic and strategic management of service design helps the business gain competitive advantages and conquer new marketsDesign management. Companies that proactively identify the interests of their customers and use this information to develop services that create good experiences for the customer will open up new and profitable business opportunities.

Companies in the service sector innovate by addressing the intangibility, heterogeneity, inseparability, and perishability of service (the IHIP challenge):

- Services are intangible; they have no physical form and they cannot be seen before purchase or taken home.
- Services are heterogenous; unlike tangible products, no two service delivery experiences are alike.
- Services are inseparable; the act of supplying a service is inseparable from the customer's act of consuming it.
- Services are perishable; they can not be inventoried.

Service design management differs in several ways from product design management. For example, the application of international trading strategies of services is difficult because the evolution of service 'from a craftsmanship attitude to industrialization of services' requires the development of new tools, approaches, and policies. Whereas goods can be manufactured centrally and delivered around the globe, services have to be performed at the place of consumption, which makes it difficult to achieve global quality consistency and effective cost control.

=== Business design management ===
Business design management is used in the development of business models. The business model canvas by Alexander Osterwalder.

Business design management deals with the newly emerging field of integrating design thinking into management. In organisation and management theory, design thinking forms part of the Architecture / Design / Anthropology (A/D/A) paradigm which characterizes innovative, human-centered enterprises. This paradigm focuses on a collaborative and iterative style of work and an adductive mode of thinking, compared to practices associated with the more traditional Mathematics / Economics / Psychology (M/E/P) management paradigm. Since 2006, the term Business Design is trademarked by the Rotman School of Management; they define business design as the application of design thinking principles to business practice. The designerly way of problem solving is an integrative way of thinking that is characterized by a deep understanding of the user, creative resolution of tensions, collaborative prototyping, and continuous modification and enhancement of ideas and solutions. This approach to problem solving can be applied to all components of business, and the management of the problem solving process forms the core of business design management activity. Universities other than the Rotman School of Management are offering similar academic education concepts, including the Aalto University in Finland, which initiated their International Design Business Management (IDBM) program in 1995.

=== Engineering design management ===
Engineering Design Management is a knowledge area within engineering management. It represents the adaptation and application of customary management practices, with the intention of achieving a productive [engineering design process]. Engineering design management is primarily applied in the context of engineering design teams, whereby the activities, outputs and influences of design teams are planned, guided, monitored and controlled. The output of an engineering design process is ultimately a description of a technical system. That technical system may either be an artefact (technical object), production facility, a process plant or any infrastructure for the benefit of society. Therefore, the domain of engineering design management includes high volume, mass production as well as low-volume, infrastructure.

=== Urban design management ===
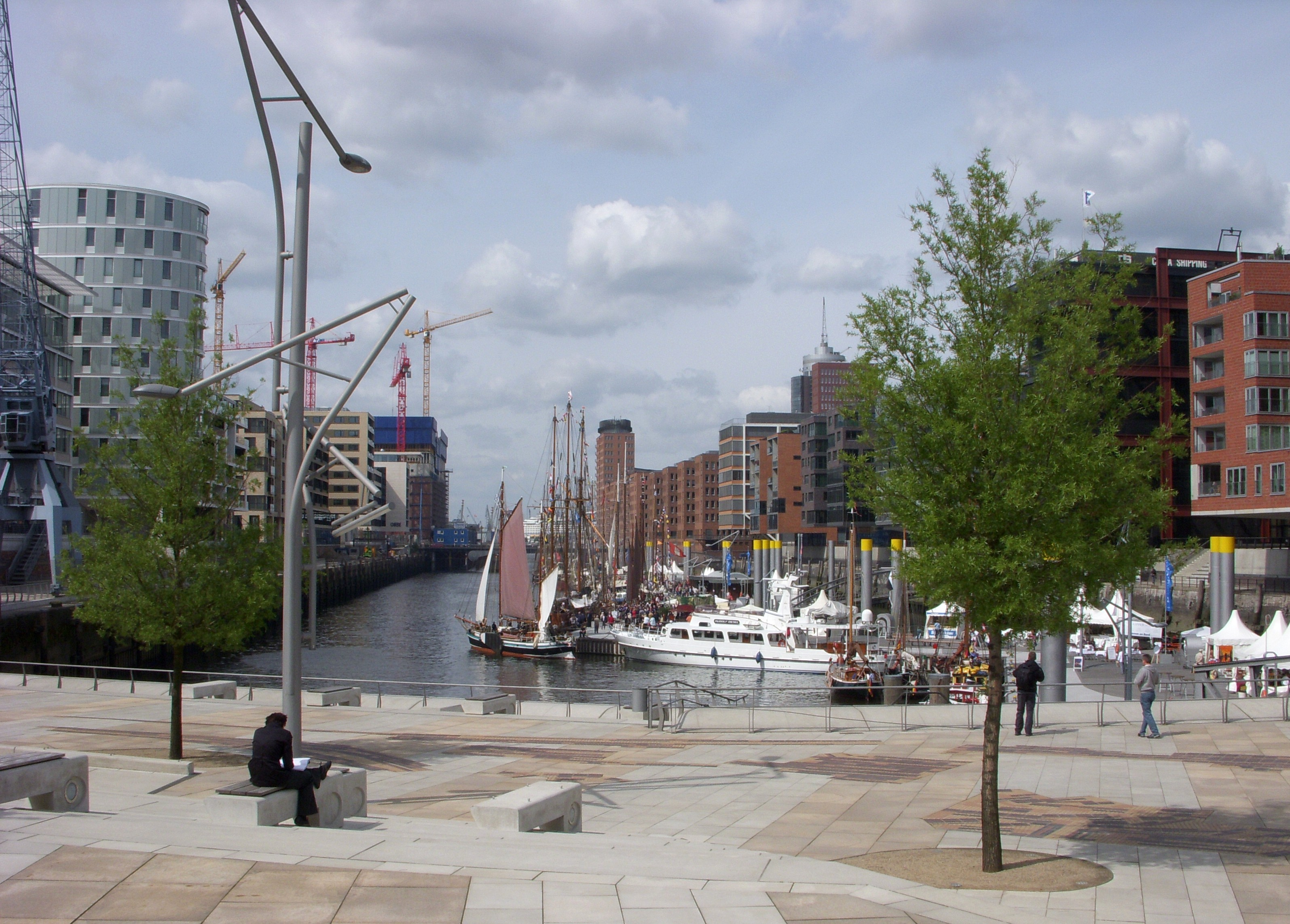
Urban design management contributes to the development of urban districts. The newly built HafenCity, Hamburg, Germany.

Urban design management involves mediation among a range of self-interested stakeholders engaged in the production of the built environment. Such mediation can encourage a joint search for mutually beneficial outcomes or integrative development. Integrative development aims to produce sustainable solutions by increasing stakeholder satisfaction with the process and with the resulting urban development.

Conventional real estate development and urban planning activities are subject to conflicting interests and positional bargaining. The integrative negotiation approach emphasises mutual gains. The approach has been applied in land use planning and environmental management, but has not been used as a coordinated approach to real estate development, city design, and urban planning. Urban design management involves reordering the chain of events in the production of the built environment according to the principles of integrative negotiation. Such negotiation can be used in urban development and planning activities to reach more efficient agreements. This leads to integrative developments and more sustainable ways to produce the built environment.

Urban design management offers prescriptive advice for practitioners trying to organise city planning activities in a way that will increase sustainability by increasing satisfaction levels. Real estate development and urban planning often occur at very different decision-making levels. The practitioners involved may have diverse educational and professional backgrounds. They certainly have conflicting interests. Providing prescriptive advice for differing, possibly conflicting, groups requires construction of a framework that accommodates all of their daily activities and responsibilities. Urban design management provides a common framework to help bring together the conventional practices of urban and regional planning, real estate development, and urban design.

The work on Integrative Negotiation Consensus Building and the Mutual Gains Approach provide a helpful theoretical framework for developing the theory of urban design management. Negotiation theory provides a useful framework for merging the perspectives of urban planning, city design, and real estate project proposals regarding production of the built environment. Interests, a key construct in negotiation theory, is an important variable that will allow integrated development, as defined above, to occur. The path-breaking work of Roger Fisher and William Ury (1981), Getting to yes, advises negotiators to focus on interests and mutual gains instead of bargaining over positions.

=== Architectural management ===
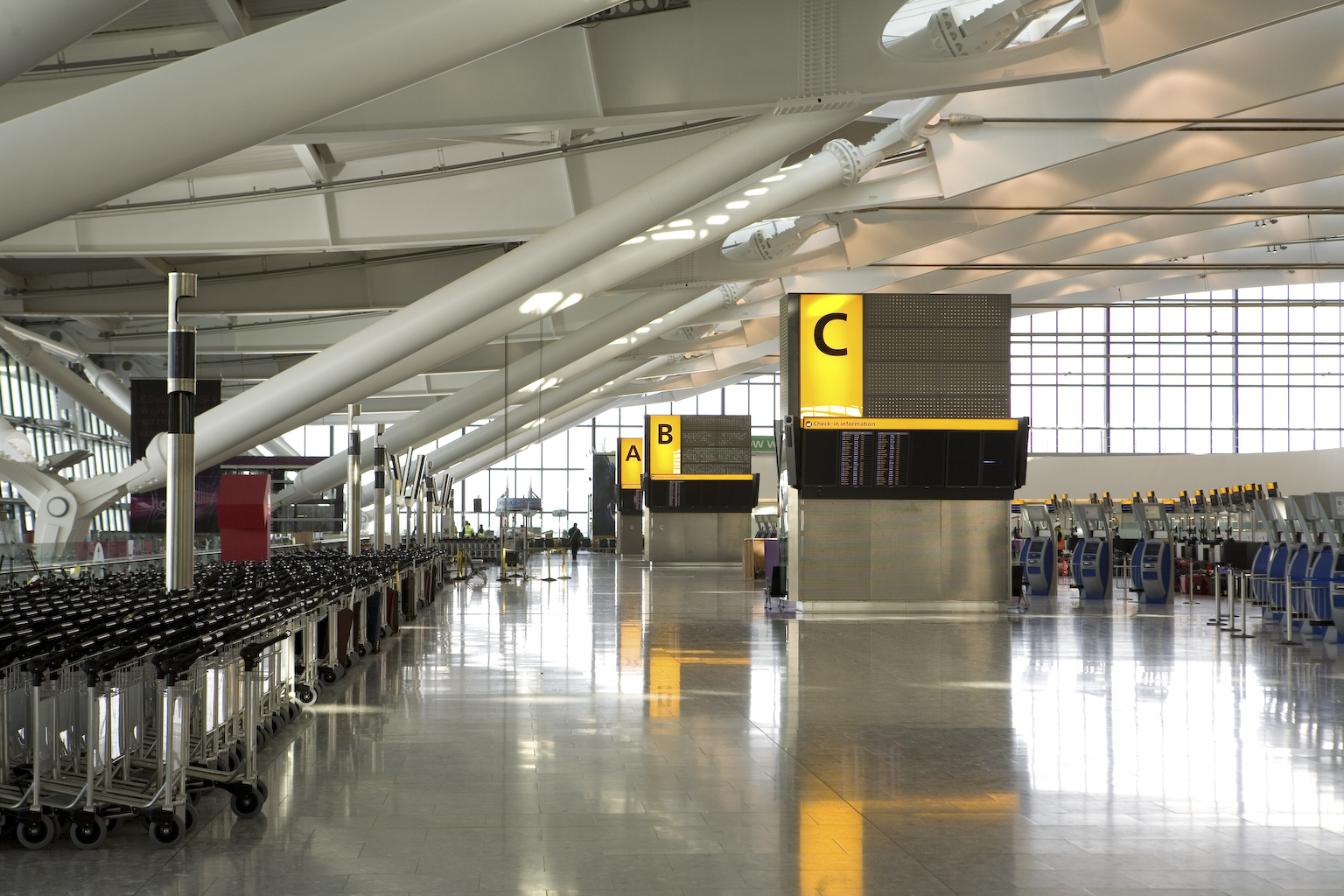
Architectural design management contributed to the development of Heathrow Terminal 5 and Heathrow Express by managing the design development and applying visionary leadership.

Architectural management can be defined as an ordered way of thinking which helps to realise a quality building for an acceptable cost or as a process function with the aim of delivering greater architectural value to the client and society. Research by Kiran Gandhi describes architectural management as a set of practical techniques for an architect to successfully operate his practice. The term architectural management has been in use since the 1960s. The evolution of the field of architectural management has not been a smooth affair. Architectural practice was merely considered a business until after the Second World War, and even then practitioners appeared to be concerned about the conflict between art and commerce, demonstrating indifference to management. There was apparent conflict between the image of an architect and the need for professional management of the architectural business. Reluctance to embrace management and business as an inherent part of architectural practice could also be seen in architectural education programmes and publications. It appears that the management of architectural design, as well as architectural management in general, is still not being given enough importance. Architectural management falls into two distinct parts: office or practice management and project management. Office management provides an overall framework within which many individual projects are commenced, managed, and completed. Architectural management extends between the management of the design process, construction, and project management, through to facilities management of buildings in use. It is a powerful tool that can be applied to the benefit of professional service firms and the total building processes, yet it continues to receive too little attention both in theory and in practice.

== Business ==
=== Value for business ===
Design plays a vital role in product and brand development, and is of great economic importance for organisations and companies. Creativity and design in particular (as an activity: design skills, methods and processes) play a growing role in creating products and services with high added value to consumers. Design generates 50% of world export revenue in the creative industries' products (goods and services). The creative industry workforce is 3.1% of total employment in the European Union (EU), which creates a revenue that is 2.6% of the EU gross value. Creative industries have attained an unprecedented average annual growth rate of 8.7 per cent across the EU between 2000 and 2005. (Note: There are 5.885 million workers across the EU in the cultural and creative sector, this are 3.1% of the total employment in the EU. Those workers generate revenue of 654 billion EUR, which is 2.6% of the EU gross value added. The creative industry is on the 3rd place among the economic sectors of the EU and the international trade in creative goods and services experienced an unprecedented average annual growth rate of 8.7 per cent between 2000 and 2005. (see below: EU-Study "The economy of culture in Europe", 2009))

The increasing importance of creative industries (and especially design) in knowledge-intense industries is reflected not only in the policies and studies on EU levels, but has initiated design and creative policies and programmes in the most advanced economies. Furthermore, design and creativity has been recognised on a regional and local level as a driving force for competitiveness, economic growth, job market, and citizen's satisfaction. The investment in creative and cultural industries are considered a significant component of EU growth in the Lisbon Strategy and the Europe 2020 strategy; and designers are increasingly involved in innovation issues.

To better understand the value of design and its role in innovation, the EU holds a public consultation on the basis of their publication Design as a driver of user-centred innovation and have published the mini-study Design as a tool for innovation. The report highlights the importance of design in user-centred innovation and recommends the integration of design into the EU innovation policy. In addition to the design share in the export of all creative industry products, design can also have a positive impact on all business performance indicators; from turnover and profit to market share and competitiveness. Design management research results can be classified as follows:

- Design improves the performance of the innovation policy and of the communications policy of the firm (Note: Design improves the performance of the innovation policy and of the communications policy of the firm. Following references are proofing this argument: de Mozota, Brigitte Borja (1985). "Essai sur la fonction du Design et son rôle dans la Stratégie marketing de l'Entreprise". Thèse de Doctorat en Sciences de Gestion. Paris: Université De Paris I Panthéon Sorbonne, Juin.; Landry, Roch (May 3, 1987). "Contributions du design industriel au processus d'innovation et de communication dans l'entreprise". Thèse Pour le Doctorat és Sciences de Gestion. Marseille: Université d'Aix-Marseille.; Brun, Monique (1990). "Le design: un outil au service de la stratégie". Revue Française du Marketing. 4 (129): 13–38.; Triad Design Project, 1989, Designing for Product Success. Design Management Institute, Boston International Exhibition.; Hetzel, Patrick. 1994. "Design management, constitution de l'offre et «néo-marketing»: les contributions du design au renouvellement de la «construction» des processus d'innovation en entreprise", Sixth International Forum on Design Management Research & Education, Paris.; Hertenstein, Julie H., and Marjorie B. Platt, 1997. "Developing a Strategic Design Culture", Design Management Journal, Spring, vol. 8, no. 2, 10–19.)
- Design improves the global performance of the firm; it is a profitable investment (Note: Design improves the global performance of the firm; it is a profitable investment. Following references are proofing this argument: Chaptal de Chanteloup, Christophe. 2011. Le Design - Management stratégique et opérationnel. Vuibert.; Design Council. "Design Fact Finder". Design Council. Archived from the original on 11 August 2010.; Rothwell, Roy, and Paul Gardiner. 1983. The Role of Design in Product and Process Change,"Design Studies, vol. 4, no. 3, July, 161–169.; Roy, Robin, G. Salaman, and Vivien Walsh. 1986. "Research Grant Final Report, Design-Based Innovation in Manufacturing Industry. Principles and Practices for Successful Design and Production", Report Dig-02, Design Innovation Group, Open University, Milton Keynes.; Hart, Susan J., Linda M. Service, and Michael J. Baker. 1989. "Design Orientation and Market Success", Design Studies, vol. 10, no. 2, April, 103–108.; Potter, Stephen, Robin; Roy, et al. 1991. "The Benefits and Costs of Investment in Design", The Open University UMIST Report Dig-03 Design Innovation Group, September.)
- Design is a profession that creates value on a macro economic level (Note: Design is a profession that creates value on a macroeconomic level. Following references are proofing this argument: HEC Etudes. 1987. "Le poids économique du design français", Etude réalisée à la demande de l'UFDI.Ministère de l'Industrie.; Ministere de l'Industrie. 1995. Les PMI Françaises et le Design, Etude de la Direction de l'Action Régionale et de la Petite et Moyenne Industrie, Octobre.; Design Business Association, 1990–1991, "Why It Pays to Invest in Good Design", by Vicky Sargent, Chief Executive DBA, Marketing Director International.)
- Design improves the competitive edge of a country in the international competition; it develops exports (Note: Design improves the competitive edge of a country in the international competition; it develops exports and favours technology transfer. Following references are proofing this argument: Corfield, K.G. 1979. Report on Product Design, National Economic Development Council.; Rothwell, Roy, and Paul Gardiner. 1983. The Role of Design in Product and Process Change,"Design Studies, vol. 4, no. 3, July, 161–169.; Ughanwa, Davidson Oyemeka. 1988. "In Search of Design Excellence", Design Studies, vol. 9, no. 4, October, 219–222.; Walsh, Vivien, Robin Roy, Margaret Bruce, and Stephen Potter. 1992.Winning by Design, Basil Blackwell.; Riedel, Johann, Robin Roy, and Stephen Potter. 1996."Market Demands that Reward Investment in Design", 8th International Forum On Design Management Research And Education, Barcelona.; Sentance, Andrew, and James Clarke. 1997. The Contribution of Design to the UK Economy, Design Council, Research Programme, Centre for Economic Forecasting, London Business School, 1–44.; Ayral, Suzanne. 1990. "Le design et le processus de choix des matériaux", Actes du Colloque Recherches sur le Design, Compiègne Octobre 1990, 243.)
- Design can help the restructuring of an economic sector in regional economic policy (Note: Design can help the restructuring of an economic sector in regional economic policy. Following references are proofing this argument: Piau, Véronique. 1990. "Les nouveaux enjeux de la conception dans la structure industrielle des années 1990,"Actes du Colloque recherches sur le Design, Octobre, Compiègne, 157.; Lovering, Tim. 1995, "Corporate Design Management as an Aid to Regional Development", 7th International Forum on Design Management Research & Education, Stanford University.; Cooper, Rachel, and Mike Press. 1995. The Design Agenda, John Wiley & Sons.; Mannervik, Ulf. 1995. "Industrial Design Culture and Its Milieu—A Regional Network Perspective", 7th International Forum on Design Management Research & Education, Stanford University.; Guimarães, Luiz, John Penny, and Stanley Moody. 1996. "Product Design and Social Needs: The Case of North East Brazil", International Journal of Technology Management, Vol. 12, No. 7,8, 849- 86.)

If and how design management is applied in a company correlates with the importance and integration of design in the company, but depends also on industry type, company size, ownership for design and type of competitive competence. A research from the Danish Design Centre (DDC) led to the "Danish Design Ladder", which shows how companies interpreted and applied design in differing depth:

1. Non-design: Companies that do not use design (15% in 2007).
2. Design as styling: Companies that use design as styling appearance (17% in 2007).
3. Design as process: Companies that integrate design into the development process (45% in 2007).
4. Design as innovation: Companies that consider design as key strategic element (21% in 2007).

The research showed that companies that considered design on a higher level of the ladder were constantly growing. Additionally, the Danish Design Centre published an Evaluation of the Importance of Design in 2006, with the result that most companies considered design as a promoter for innovation (71%), as a growth potential for the company (79%), and to make products more user friendly (71%). With increasing importance of design for the company, design management also becomes more important.

The value of design can be leveraged if it is managed well. Research by Chiva and Alegre shows that there is no link between the level of design investment and business success, but instead a strong correlation between design management skills and business success. This means that efficient and effective design management is crucial for maximising the value of design. Effective design management increases the efficiency of operations and process management, has a significant positive impact on process management, improves quality performance (internal and external quality), and increases operating performance. To measure and communicate the value of design management, Borja de Mozota suggests adapting the Balanced Score Card model and structuring the values in the following four categories:

- Internal business processes: Design management as an innovation process, providing improvements in company performance and processes. Here, these innovations and processes are totally invisible to outsiders.
- Learning and growing: Beyond advanced design management. Design explicit knowledge is applied to strategic focus and improves the quality of staff.
- Customer and brand: Design management as perception and brand. Design knowledge is applied to corporate difference building and strategic positioning.
- Financial: The historic design management economic model. Design management as an explicit and measurable value for company reputation and stock market performance.

=== Relation to other disciplines and departments ===
Three different orientations for the choice of design management can be identified in companies. These orientations influence the perception of management and the responsibility of design managers within the organisation. The strategic orientations are; market focus, product focus and brand focus.

- Product-driven organisations often have design responsibility in their research and development (R&D) departments.
- Market-focus driven organisation often have design responsibility in their marketing departments.
- Brand-focus driven organisations often have design responsibility in corporate communication.

Depending on the strategic orientation, design management overlaps with other management branches to differing extents:

Marketing management: The concepts and elements of brand management overlap with those of design management. In practice, design management can be part of the job profile of a marketing manager, though the discipline includes aspects that are not in the domain of marketing management. This intersection is called "brand design management" and consists of positioning, personality, purpose, personnel, project and practice, (Note: The elements of design management are: purpose, personnel, Presence, Project and Practice. The elements of brand management are identity, positioning, personality, system and equity. The elements of brand design management are positioning, personality (personality and presence), purpose (identity and purpose), personnel, project and practice, with the objective to increase brand equity.) where the objective is to increase brand equity.

Operations management: At the operational level design management deals with the management of design projects. Processes and tools from operations management can be applied to design management in the execution of design projects.

Strategic management: Due to the increasing importance of design as a differentiator and its supporting role in brand equity, design management deals with strategic design issues and supports the strategic direction of the business or enterprise. The debate on design thinking suggests the integration of design thinking into strategic management. Design thinking and strategic thinking have some commonalities in their characteristics, both are synthetic, adductive, hypothesis-driven, opportunistic, dialectical, enquiring and value-driven.

Innovation management: The value of the coordinating role of design in new product development has been well documented. Design management can help to improve innovation management, which can be measured by three variables: it reduces time-to-market, by improving sources and communication skills and developing cross-functional innovation; it stimulates networking innovation, by managing product and customer information flows with internal (e.g. teams) and external (e.g. suppliers, society) actors; it improves the learning process by promoting a continuous learning process.

=== Hierarchy ===
Like the management of strategy, design can be managed on three levels: strategic (corporate level or enterprise wide), tactical (business level or individual business units), and operational (individual project level). These three levels have been termed differently by various authors over the last 50 years.

Terms used to describe levels of strategy management and design management
strategic level	tactical level	operational level	author / source
corporate strategy	business strategy	functional strategy	Haberberg and Rieple, 2001
corporate strategy	business strategy	operational strategy	Johnson and Scholes, 1999
business management / office management		individual project / job management	Brunton, 1964
corporate / innovation design management	design agency management	design project management	Topalian, 1980
design policy management	—N/a	operational design management	Oakley, 1984
strategic design management	—N/a	operational design management	Olins, 1985
strategic (macro)	organisational (meso)	team / individual (micro)	Francis and Fischbacher, 1996
corporate design management	design organisation management	design project management	Chung, 1998
anticipative / strategic design management	functional design management	operational design management	de Mozota, 1998
strategic design management	tactical design management	operational design management	Joziasse, 2000
board / top function	middle / business function	design activity function	Cooper, 1995
design strategy management	design resource management	design project management	Kootstra, 2006

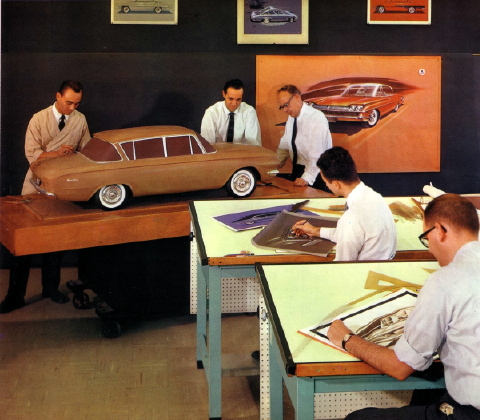
Operational design management deals, among other things, with individual design projects and teams. Standing by the scale model's left front fender is Dick Teague, a design manager at American Motors Corporation (AMC) in 1961.

Operational level

Operational design management involves the management of individual design projects and design teams. Its goal is to achieve the objectives set by strategic design management. Success of good design management can be measured by evaluating the quality of operational design management outcomes. It includes the selection and management of design suppliers and encompasses the documentation, supervision, and evaluation of design processes and results. It deals with personal leadership, emotional intelligence, and the cooperation with and management of internal communications. Regular management functions, tools, and concepts can often be applied to the management of design on the operational level. It is implemented to achieve specific design objectives and manage the judgment of design proposals. It can help to build brand equity through the consistent creation and implementation of high-quality design solutions that best fit the brand identity and desired consumer experience, in the most efficient way. Depending on the type of company and industry, the following job titles are associated with this role: operational design manager, senior designer, team leader, visual communication manager, corporate design coordinator, and others.

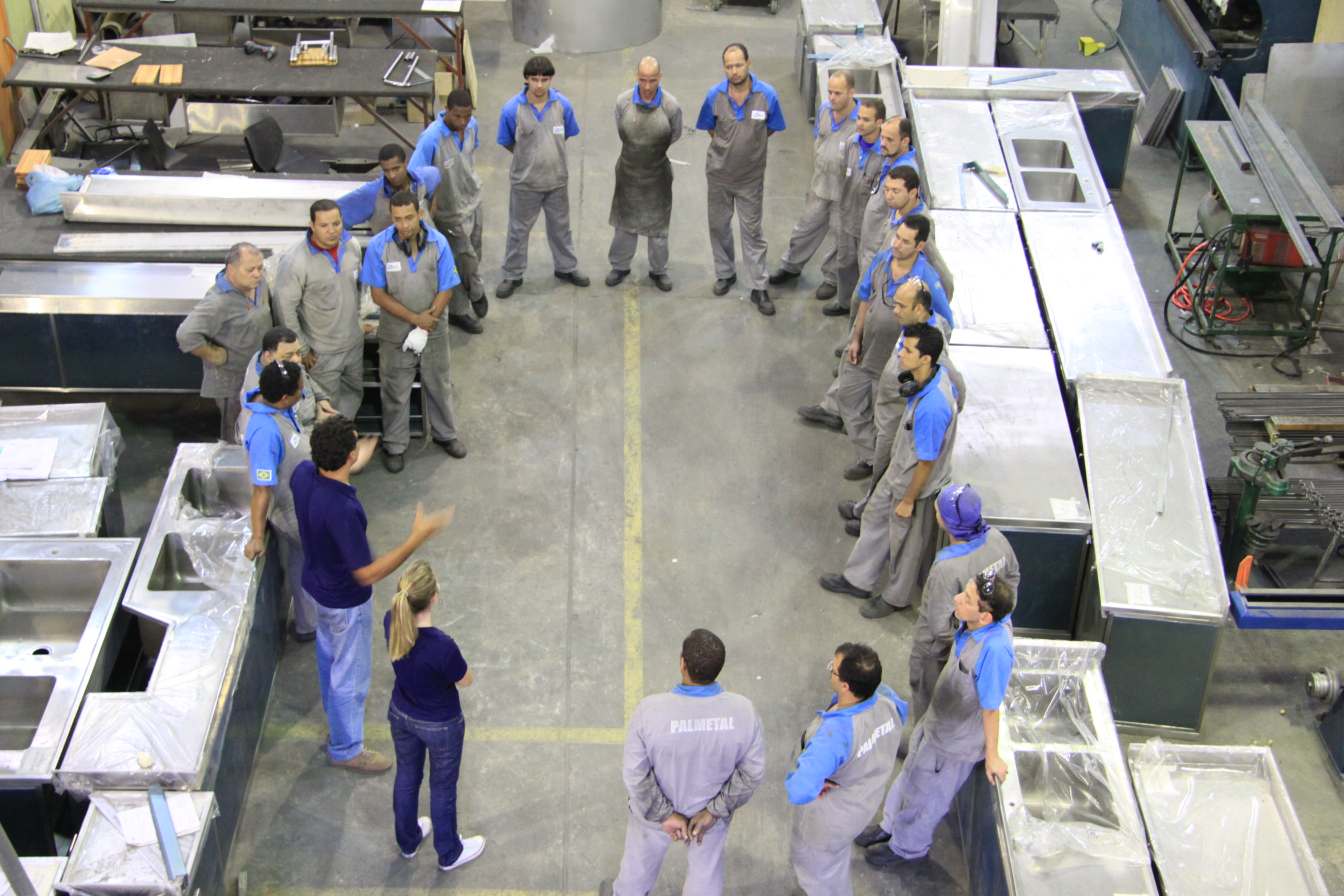
Tactical design management deals, among other things, with creating awareness for design issues in the company. Training meeting in an eco-design stainless steel company in Brazil.

Tactical level

Tactical design management addresses the organisation of design resources and design processes. Its goal is to create a structure for design in the company, bridging the gap between objectives set through strategic design management and the implementation of design on the operational level. It defines how design is organised within the company. This includes the use of a central body to coordinate different design projects and activities. It deals with defining activities, developing design skills and competencies, managing processes, systems and procedures, assigning of roles and responsibilities, developing innovative products and service concepts, and finding new market opportunities. Outcomes of tactical design management are related to the creation of a structure for design within the company, to build internal resources and competencies for the implementation of design. Depending on the type of company and industry, the following job titles are associated with this function: tactical design manager, design director, design & innovation manager, brand design manager, new product development (NPD) manager, visual identity manager, and others.

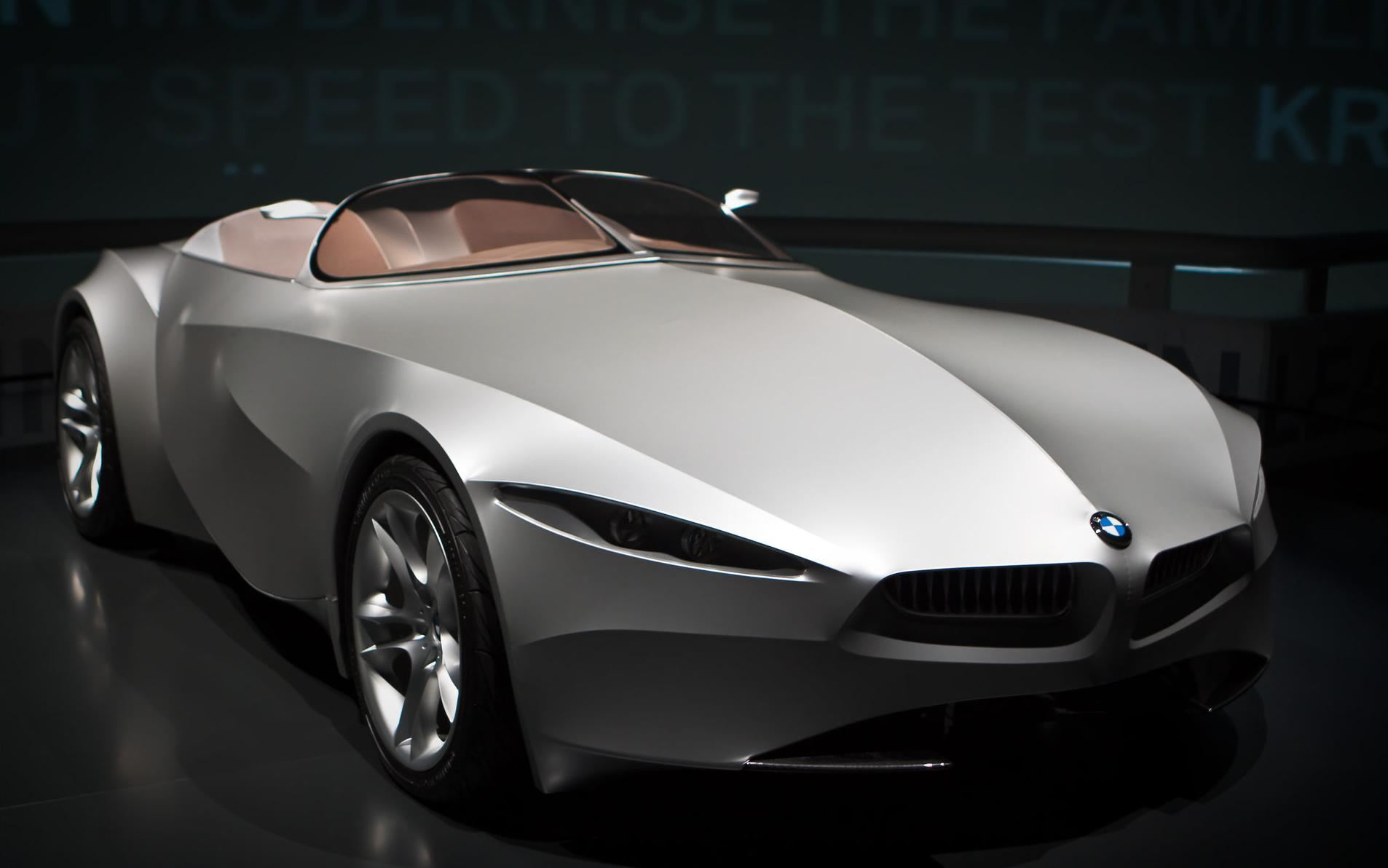
Strategic design management deals, among other things, with envisioning the future. Visionary automotive concept BMW GINA, BMW Museum, Munich, Germany.

Strategic level

Strategic design management involves the creation of strategic long-term vision and planning for design, and deals with defining the role of design within the company. The goal of strategic design management is to support and strengthen the corporate visio by creating a relationship between the design and corporate strategy. It includes the creation of design, brand and product strategies, ensuring that design management becomes a central element in the corporate strategy formulation process. Strategic design management is responsible for the development and implementation of a corporate design programme that influences the design vision, mission, and positioning. It allows design to interact with the needs of corporate management and focuses on the long-term capabilities of design. Where strategic design management is applied, there is often a strong belief in the potential to differentiate the company and gain competitive advantage by design. As a result, design thinking becomes integrated into the corporate culture. Depending on the type of company and industry the following job titles are associated with this function: design strategist, strategic design manager, chief design officer, vice president design and innovation, chief creative officer, innovation design director, and others.

=== Role and responsibility ===
Design management is not a standard model that can be projected onto every enterprise, nor is there a specific way of applying it that leads to guaranteed success. Design management processes are carried out by humans with different responsibilities and backgrounds, who work in different industries and enterprises with different sizes and traditions, whilst having different target groups and markets to serve. Design management is multifaceted, and so are the different applications of and views on design management. The function of design management in an organisation depends on its tasks, authority, and practice.

Task

Similar tasks can be grouped into categories to describe the job profile of a design manager. Different categories in management that encompass design were defined by several authors; those tasks occur on all three design management levels (strategic, tactical, and operational):

Terms used to describe categories of tasks of design managers
strategy and purpose	personnel and organisation	organisational culture and presence	projects	practice and process	author / source
strategy and purpose	—N/a	—N/a	projects	—N/a	Topalian, 1980
strategy and policy	human resources	—N/a	projects	—N/a	Oakley, 1984
N/A	—N/a	—N/a	—N/a	process	Hetzel, 1998
strategy and policy	human and material resources	—N/a	—N/a	—N/a	Blaich, 1998
strategy	organisation and human resources	information resources	projects	—N/a	Chung, 1998
strategy and purpose	human resources	organisation culture	projects	process, practice and support	Powell, 1998
strategy and vision	human resources, organisational structure	organisational culture	—N/a	process, tools and methodologies	Joziasse, 2000
strategy, planning	structure, finance, human resources	information and communication, link to R&D, link to branding	project management	evaluation	de Mozota, 2003
strategy and policy formation, goals, targets, objectives	people and structure, investment and finance, training and learning, resourcing	communication	projects, planning and scheduling, implementation, monitoring, documentation	process planning, evaluation	Cooper, 1995

Authority and position

The authority and position of the design management function has a large influence on what the design manager does in his or her daily job. Kootstra (2006) distinguishes design management types by organisational function: design management as line function, design management as staff function, and design management as support function. Design management as a "line function" is directly responsible for design execution in the "primary" organisational process and can take place on all levels of the design management hierarchy. The main attributes for design managers in the line are authority over and direct responsibility for the result. Design management as a staff function is not directly responsible for design execution in the "primary" organisational process, but consults as a specialist on all levels of the design management hierarchy. The main attributes for design managers in this function are their limited authority and the need to consult line managers and staff. When the design process is defined as a "secondary" organisational process, design management is seen as "supportive function". In this function it has only a supportive character, classifying the design manager as a creative specialist towards product management, brand management, marketing, R&D, and communication. Various authors use different concepts to describe the authority and position of design management; they can be grouped as follows:

Terms used to describe categories of position and authority of design management
organisational structure & decision-making	leadership / management style	collaboration / intergroup conflict	process integration	author / source
centralisation vs. decentralisation; design at top-level management	flexibility vs. consistency; autonomy vs. control	grouping of activities	pre-development activities; product development and testing; commercialisation	Cooper, 1995
N/A	—N/a	Design made without interorganisational cooperation (sub-contract); design made with interorganisational cooperation (company-wide design culture); making design together (network); design made alone (internalisation, selling design expertise)	N/A	Mozota, 2003
staff-function; line-function; support-function	N/A	—N/a	—N/a	Kootstra, 2006
functional structure (basic structure); independent project organisation (self-contained group); matrix organisation	N/A	design champion; design policy; design programme; design as function (like a design department); design as infusion (everyone is concerned with design, silent designers)	N/A	Stamm, 2005
N/A	—N/a	—N/a	Fuzzy Front End (FFE); Product Development Process (PDP); Market Operations (MO)	Buckler, 1997

== See also ==
- Brand management
- Business model
- Corporate Identity
- Design
- Design leadership
- Design strategy
- Innovation
- Marketing
- Operations management
- Product management
- Programme management
- Project management
- Strategic design
- Strategic management
- Strategic planning
