= Bernd Schneider =

Bernd Schneider may refer to:

- Bernd Schneider (racing driver) (born 1964), German racecar driver
- Bernd Schneider (chess player) (born 1965), German chess player
- Bernd Schneider (footballer) (born 1973), German football player
- Bernd Schneider, founder of Vacu Vin, Netherlands
