= Temahome =

Portuguese furniture exporter

TemaHome
- Company type: Private
- Industry: Manufacturing, Furniture, Interior design
- Founded: 1981 in Lisbon, Portugal
- Headquarters: Lisbon, (Central offices) and Tomar (Factory), Portugal
- Key people: Alice Teles Silva, Sales & MKT; Luis Vicente, Production and José Melo, Supply Chain
- Products: furniture, rugs, light fixture
- Number of employees: 184 (2008)
- Website: www.temahome.com

TemaHome is a furniture exporter based in Lisbon, Portugal.

The company's main markets are Germany, Switzerland, Portugal, Spain, Denmark and the United States. As of January 2008, the company exports to 40 countries.

== Company history ==
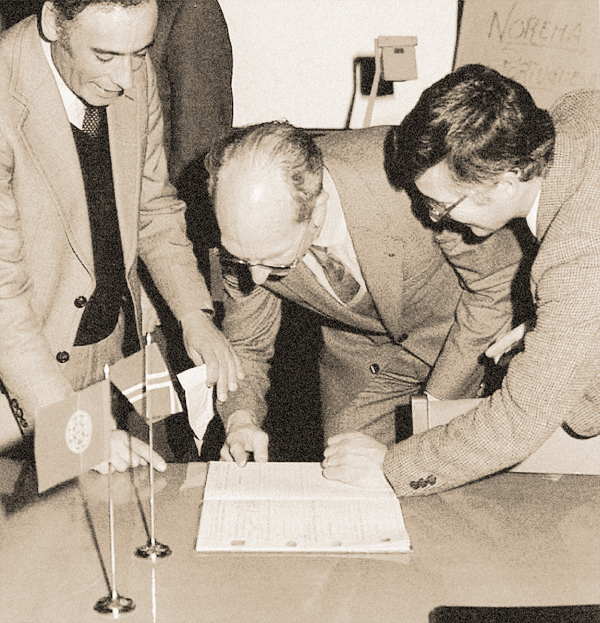
The Portuguese secretary of economy and the Norwegian ambassador signing the agreement that originated the company, Lisbon, 1981

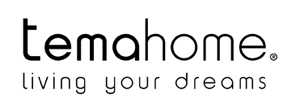
Former logo

Founded as Norema Portuguesa in 1981 by the marriage of the Norwegian Norema SA and the Portuguese Mendes Godinho SA, it was meant to combine the Norway's high technology with the Portuguese affordable costs to produce furniture.

Between 1984 and 1994, the company manufactured a line of modular furniture for IKEA.

In 1995, the Norwegian partners took complete ownership of the company and started to produce kitchen, bathroom and living furniture exclusively to the Norwegian market where it maintained its own flagship stores.

In 2000, TemaHome was created through the leadership of its new major shareholder, 3i. From this point on, the ownership of the company was composed by four different stockholders, 3i (41.50%), the Spanish MCH (25.25%), the Portuguese ESCAPITAL (25.25%) and its management team (8%).

Later in 2006, a new ownership structure was defined by a Management buy-in headed by a new management team and ownership was divided as follows: Management team (30%), Lead Capital management fund (60%) and an individual investor, Miguel Calado (10%).

By the end of 2007, the company employed over 170 workers in its staff, distribute between its Lisbon headquarters and a 16.500 Sq meters production plant in the city of Tomar.

TemaHome produces contemporary furniture and decorative accents combining modern lines and designs by some Portuguese designers such as Filipe Alarcão.

== Product range ==
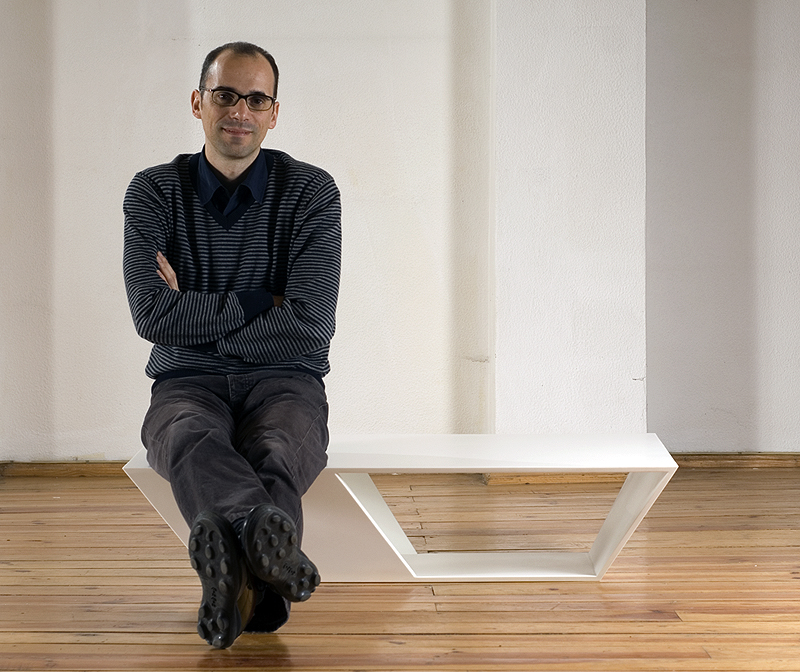
Filipe Alarcão and the GEM table

The range of products is composed by 3 distinct lines: essence, style and trends.

- Essence: Basic essential furnishing, ready to assembly similar to the IKEA style.
- Style: A more detailed, design oriented line of products superior in quality of materials.
- Trends: furnishing by international designers.

== Design team ==
The company has relied in Portuguese designer Filipe Alarcão to lead its team of in house designers. Besides Filipe, the company works independently with names like Miguel Vieira Baptista, Fernando Brizio and Jette Fyhn.

The in house team is composed by Maria Joao Maia, Délio Vicente, and Nádia Soares.

The company also works in cooperation on external designers like Marco Sousa Santos, Fernando Brizio and Miguel Vieira Batista.

== Awards ==
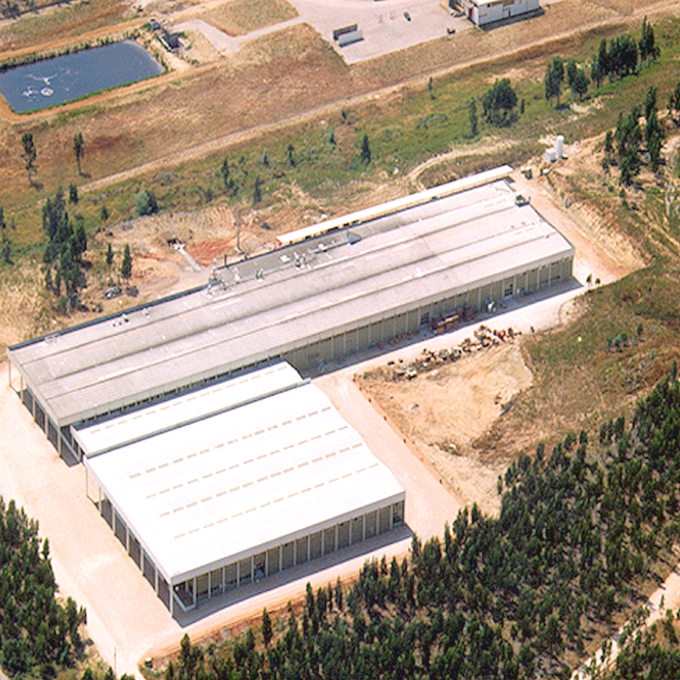
Temahome factory in Tomar

- 2009 Design Management Europe Award - Medium-sized Company
- 2007 Mobis award - Best contemporary manufacturer
- 2007 Leader company status - IAPMEI (Portugal institution for small and medium businesses)
- 2002 Portugal Best Small and Medium businesses award
- 2000 Portugal Best Small and Medium businesses award
