= Building management =

Building management (in the UK) is a discipline that comes under the umbrella of facility management. Hard services usually relate to physical, structural services such as fire alarm systems, lifts, and so on whereas soft services allude to cleaning, landscaping, security, and suchlike human-sourced services.

== Building manager ==
A building manager is a person who supervises the hard and soft services of a built structure. There are essentially two types of building manager positions: residential and commercial. Cf. "Building superintendent".

== Residential building management ==
In a residential environment, an Estate manager will typically supervise a team of porters or concierge, cleaners, electrical and mechanical contractors, and depending on the size of the development, a facilities manager and team of administrative staff. If the development comprises several blocks, it is common that the Estate manager will report to a Senior property manager. The Estate manager is responsible for the day-to-day running of the development with particular focus on the maintenance, site staff management, health and safety and presentation of the building or residential complex. The biggest challenge in the role is to manage residents' expectations and match these up to the budget constraints and prevalent legal requirements.

== Managing agent ==
An external property management company that will issue and chase up the service charges, supervise the annual budget, and approve any additional works and requirements so that the development complies with current health and safety legislation and to ensure that the residential development, building, or estate is maintained in accordance with the lease requirements and the service level agreement determined by both the lease and the service charge levied. They also manage the on-site staff (i.e. the Estate manager and his team). They do this on behalf of the freeholder and they are only responsible for maintaining the communal areas and not the apartments themselves which are referred to in property management jargon as the "demised premises".

== Leaseholders ==
The owners of the apartments can be at the same time occupiers but in some cases, they will be investors. They are responsible for the maintenance of their apartments (known as demised premises) and they pay an annual service charge, inclusive of a fee, to the managing agent for managing the communal parts.

== Freeholder ==
The freeholder has possession over the freehold of the development (i.e. the communal areas and the land the site was built on). Normally, the freeholder is the developer but in some developments, the leaseholders, when formed into a residents association, purchase the freehold this is known as an RMC and the residents need to form a company with rules and regulations, a secretary a chairman and must make a copy of their annual accounts available to Companies House.

== Contracted maintenance companies ==
The contracted maintenance companies that have been appointed to maintain different parts of the building (fire alarms, electrical and mechanical systems, CCTV, intercom systems, car park, landscaping, etc.) must comply with relevant health and safety, and with common practices for their industry. The building or property manager must justify the costs of these systems to the leaseholders and freeholder. Therefore, the contracted companies must keep their prices as low as is reasonable.

== External regulatory bodies ==
External regulatory bodies include local councils, Health Education Officers, and Fire Safety Officers. It is the job of the building manager to ensure that all parties in the regulatory bodies are satisfied, which causes further complexity.

The building manager with the assistance and guidance of the managing company he or she works for will implement renovation, maintenance, and repair projects as required. The challenge can be in many cases to balance these requirements with important priorities such as those dictated by the Fire, Health, and Safety legislation as well as following the industry's codes of good practice and compliance. Both residential and commercial developments vary greatly in type depending on the standard, asset value and the service level agreement provided will depend on these factors.

== Commercial building management ==
Commercial building management involves the operation and oversight of non-residential properties, which include office spaces, retail units and industrial facilities. Tenants in commercial properties are typically corporate entities or businesses rather than individual occupants.

A commercial property manager oversees both the operational and financial performance of a facility. Primary responsibilities include administering lease agreements, collecting rent, and marketing vacant spaces to attract occupancy. Property managers are also responsible for organising maintenance and repairs and ensuring that the facility adheres to health, safety and statutory regulations.

Notable property management firms in the United Kingdom include Connels, CBRE UK, Places for People, Savills, RMG, First Port, Rendall & Rittner, Encore and Trinity Estates.

== See also ==
- Architectural management
- Property Management
