= Design leadership =

Planning and directing the design department

Design leadership is a concept complementary to design management. In practice, design managers within companies often operate in the field of design leadership and design leaders in the field of design management. However, the two terms are not interchangeable; they are interdependent. In essence, design leadership aims to define future strategies, and design management is responsible for implementation. Both are critically important to business, government, and society, and both are necessary in order to maximize value from design activity and investment.

Design leadership can be described as leadership that generates innovative design solutions. Turner defines design leadership by adding three additional aspects for design leadership:

- the difference in leading through design,
- the sustaining design leadership over time
- the gaining of acknowledgment for achievements through design.

Turner separates the core responsibilities of design leadership into the following six activities:

- envisioning of the future
- manifesting strategic intent
- directing design investment
- managing corporate reputation
- creating and nurturing an environment of innovation
- training for design leadership

Design Leadership is a growing professional practice and the value of such specialization is proven through the appointment of executive leadership roles, such that of Chief Design officer, Chief Creative officer, or similar roles and titles.

== See also ==
- Corporate Identity
- Design management
- Design
- Leadership
- Reputation management
