= Architectural management =

Architectural management falls into two distinct parts, office management and project management. (Emmitt, 1999a & 1999b). Office management provides an overall framework within which individual projects are commissioned, designed and completed. Both parts have the same objectives but are typically addressed by separate management systems. Office management involves the allocation and financing of resources, principally premises, trained staff and computer systems, and focuses on establishing and charging appropriate fees for the services rendered. Project management focuses on timescales, developing a design from initial concept to working drawings, and managing the construction process (see for example Emmitt, 2014).

The essence of architectural management is to ensure that work on a project is cost-effective and to achieve a balance between profitability and design quality.

== Development ==
Standard management techniques and tools, borrowed mainly from repetitive industrial processes, have not always fitted comfortably with the image of the architect as a creative individual, rather than a professional member of a business team. The term ‘architectural management’ has been in use since the 1960s as building construction became more complex, because of a shift from standard traditional construction details, to innovation and experimentation.

Architectural practices generally employ an office manager who may have at their disposal an administration assistant or team of assistants. Project management is increasingly a role played by an independent consultant, especially during the construction phase. Project managers are typically from one of the surveying disciplines, leaving only the architectural elements to be managed in-house by the architects.

== See also ==
- Building management
- Facility management

== Sources ==
- Emmitt, Stephen (1999a). "Architectural management: an evolving field". Engineering, Construction and Architectural Management. 6 (2): 188–196.#
- Emmitt, Stephen (1999b). Architectural Management in Practice: a competitive approach. Harlow: Longman.
- Emmitt, Stephen (2014). "Design Management for Architects, Second Edition". Chichester: Wiley-Blackwell.
- Emmitt, Stephen; Matthijs Prins; Ad den Otter (2009). Architectural management: International research and practice. Oxford: Wiley-Blackwell.
- Emmit, Stephen (2007). Design Management for Architects. Oxford: Blackwell Publishing.
- Boissevain, Gustaaf W.O.; Matthijs Prins (1995). "Architectural management and design management - the state of the art in Netherlands and ideas for research". International Journal of Architectural Management, Practice and Research. 9.
