= Jorge de Alarcão =

Portuguese archaeologist (born 1934)

Jorge de Alarcão (born 3 November 1934 in Coimbra, Portugal) is a Portuguese archaeologist. He earned his Bachelor's degree in Historical and Philosophical Sciences at the University of Coimbra and became a Postgrad in Western European Archaeology at the University of London. His doctoral dissertation was on Cerâmica Comum Local e Regional de Conimbriga. He has received honorary doctorates from the University of Bordeaux (1985) and Santiago de Compostela (1996) and has oriented at least 50 students.

Between 1967 and 1974 he directed the Machado de Castro National Museum in Coimbra. From 1967 to 2000 he directed the Institute of Archaeology, Faculty of Letters of Coimbra.

His more than ninety publications include Les villas romaines de São Cucufate, written in collaboration with R. Etienne and F. Mayet. His English publications include the two-volume edited work Roman Portugal (1988). His fields include classical archaeology, especially in Portugal, and archaeological theory.

He has been awarded the Ordre des Palmes Académiques, the Prémio Gulbenkian de Arqueologia, and the "Génio Protector da Colónia Augusta Emérita" award.
