= Tom Hardy (designer) =

American design strategist and academic

- Education: Auburn University
- Occupations: Designer, university teacher
- Employers: IBM; Savannah College of Art and Design

Tom Hardy (born 1946) is an American design strategist, Professor of Design Management at Savannah College of Art and Design (SCAD). and former head of the Corporate IBM Design Program. As corporate design advisor to Samsung Electronics (1996–2003) Hardy was instrumental in creating a new brand-design ethos: "Balance of Reason & Feeling", and building global brand equity through use of design strategy and design management. While at IBM (1970–1992), he was an award-winning industrial designer and later served as corporate head of the IBM Design Program responsible for worldwide brand-design identity. (Note: Multiple sources on his awards:) His leadership contributed to the revitalization of IBM's brand image via differentiated design such as the arguably influential ThinkPad.

== Early life and education ==
Hardy's early life was spent in Alabama, where he graduated from Hueytown High School in 1964 and pursued his undergraduate education in industrial design at Auburn University (1964–1970) under Eva Pfeil (German) and Walter Schaer (Swiss), former students at the Ulm School of Design in Germany. During his graduate work in the History and Sociology of Technology and Science at Georgia Institute of Technology (1995–1996), he consulted with Georgia Tech to create CoLab, a multi-disciplinary innovation laboratory that integrated engineering, marketing and industrial design for industry-sponsored projects.

== Career ==
=== IBM ===
Early in his career, Hardy was the industrial designer of numerous IBM products, including the original IBM Personal Computer introduced in 1981. During the 1970s, he also designed advanced industrial design concepts for 'single user computers' during the infancy of personal computing. His work included a human-centered design model in 1973 to complement the IBM engineering prototype of SCAMP dubbed by PC Magazine as "the world's first personal computer". Examples of Hardy's advanced PC concepts are published in the book: DELETE: A Design History of Computer Vapourware.

As corporate head of the IBM Design Program, Hardy directed worldwide brand-design identity operations in concert with designers Paul Rand and Richard Sapper. His work has been cited in numerous publications, including a London Business School Case Study that documented Hardy's role in development of the first IBM ThinkPad notebook computer (1992) (Note: Sources on his contributions to ThinkPad:) together with a differentiated product personality strategy. This work focused on providing more human-centric character to help revitalize IBM's brand image in the 1990s. (Note: Sources on "human-centric" work:)

=== Design strategist ===
Later an independent consultant upon retiring from IBM in 1992, Hardy's work with Samsung Electronics (1996–2003) involved creating a strategic brand-design approach of duality: "Balance of Reason and Feeling", while integrating a comprehensive design management system and innovation strategy into the corporate culture. His introduction of brand-design infrastructure elements that were definable, repeatable, measurable, scalable and actionable has been cited in business publications as strategic assets that resulted in an identity for Samsung that helped elevate the company's global brand image and brand equity value. (Note: Sources on his contributions to Samsung:)

As a methodology for Hardy's consulting work, he developed the Verbal-Visual Framework (VVF), a brand-design management tool that identifies symbolic value. VVF builds emotional brand connections and trust with customers, together with guiding contextual brand-design personality across products, packaging, and communications to ensure cross-modal brand alignment.

=== Educator ===
Hardy currently serves as Professor of Design Management and Graduate Coordinator at Savannah College of Art and Design (SCAD), and has conducted corporate executive education workshops on Design thinking and Scenario planning for companies such as Porsche, Steelcase,and Turkcell,.

== Contributions and recognition ==
=== Government ===
In 1992, Hardy was invited by the U.S. presidential transition team to participate as a member of President Bill Clinton's Roundtable on Design. The purpose of the event was to create ideas on how innovative design can contribute to America's competitiveness, sustainability, and inclusiveness. Following the Roundtable on Design, he was selected to testify before the 103rd Congressional Committee on Science, Space and Technology as to the importance of design innovation in commercialization of technologies and U.S. competitiveness. Hardy also participated in another government design initiative in 1993 as Chair of a National Endowment for the Arts' Design Program working group to propose a White House Council on Design. In 2000, he was appointed to the Presidential Design Awards Jury for Federal Design Achievement in Graphic Design and Industrial/Product Design.

Hardy has also been involved in other nation-related projects, such as 2013 field research for developing the 'ThaiWorks' platform, a Thai initiative in context of creative economic development for Northern Thailand.

=== Brand-design leadership and product design ===
The 2007 anniversary issue of PC Magazine highlighted Hardy's management leadership role in the original IBM ThinkPad development process and deemed him 'Innovator of the Year 1992'. In 2016, two products directly influenced by Hardy during his IBM career were selected by Time Magazine as being among "The 50 Most Influential Gadgets of All Time". They are: (#5) the first IBM Personal Computer 5150 and (#21) the IBM ThinkPad 700C. The 50 products were cited by Time as "The tech that forever changed the way we live, work and play".

In the 2023 documentary film "Modernism, Inc." role as former head of the Corporate IBM Design Program, Hardy reflected on IBM Design Program history in context of when Eliot Noyes, Paul Rand and Charles Eames were the corporate design consultants and their leadership transformed the brand image of IBM through design.

The following are awards for Hardy's industrial design:

- Industrial Designers Society of America Gold IDEA – 1980 (USA)
- Premio SMAU Innovation Award – 1977 (Italy)
- iF Product Design Award – 1983 (Germany)
- I.D. Magazine Annual Design Review Awards – 1977, 1981, 1982, 1983 (USA)

== See also ==
- IBM 5120
