= Filipe Alarcão =

Portuguese product designer (born 1963)

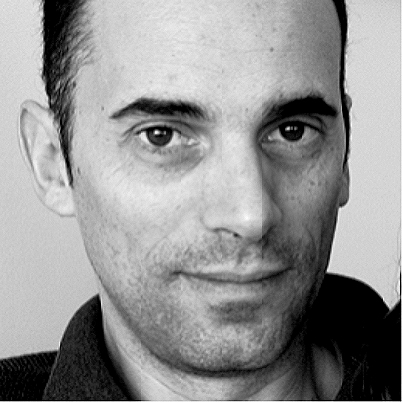
- Born: 1963 (age 62–63); Lisbon, Portugal
- Education: Domus Academy, Postgraduate School of Design
- Occupation: Product designer

Filipe Alarcão (born 1963 in Lisbon, Portugal) is a Portuguese product designer. His designs range from the renowned china, porcelain and casual dishes manufactured by Vista Alegre to the contemporary furniture design of Temahome.

== Education ==
He obtained a degree in equipment design from the Lisbon school of fine arts and a master's degree in industrial design from the Domus Academy, Postgraduate School of Design in Milan, Italy.

== Career ==
From 1995 to 1997, Filipe worked with Michele de Lucchi, in Milan, as a consultant for Olivetti Personal Computers, developing projects for personal computers.

Currently, he lives and works in Lisbon, with his own atelier where he develops industrial design projects in furniture, urban equipment and products, lighting, ceramics and glass in collaboration with several Portuguese and foreign companies among them Vista Alegre Atlantis, Asplund, Temahome, Schréder, Senda, Cerâmicas São Bernardo, Larus and Moda Lisboa.

In interior design, he has created spaces such as the Moda Lisboa design shop, Galeria Atlantis, Design aus Portugal exhibit in Frankfurt and the Delidelux shop. His works are shown at the Design museum at the Belem cultural center in Lisbon.

== Awards ==
- 1994 National Design Award of the Portuguese Center for Design
- 2002 Polis competition for global signage systems for urban places in Portugal
- 2002 First place - Architecture competition Museum of Contemporary Art of Elvas
