= Madara Cosmetics =

Company based in Latvia

MÁDARA Cosmetics
- Company type: Public company
- Industry: Cosmetics
- Founded: July 28, 2006
- Headquarters: Marupe, Latvia
- Products: Body lotion, Balm, Skin care
- Revenue: €23.22 million (2025)
- Net income: 1,694,339 (2023)
- Total assets: 16,680,465 (2023)
- Number of employees: 180
- Website: www.madaracosmetics.com

MADARA Cosmetics also known as MÁDARA, is a Latvian manufacturer of organic skin care, hair care and baby care products. The ingredients include biologically certified blossoms and herbal extracts from the Northern and Baltic region. The brand name MADARA is the Latvian name for a common inhabitant of Baltic meadows – Galium mollugo, commonly known as bedstraw or wild madder. Its spatial pattern or fractal is also depicted in the logo of MADARA Cosmetics, which received the EULDA/WOLDA award and the title "Best of Latvia" in 2007.

The company was co-founded by Lotte Tisenkopfa-Iltnere. MADARA Cosmetics is a publicly traded company listed in the NASDAQ First North market.

== Products ==
The company produces over 80 different cosmetic products, including face and body care products made from herbs and flowers harvested in the Baltic region according to organic farming principles. Products include cleansers, toners and moisturizers for face, tinted moisturizers, shower soaps, body cream and lotions and products for lips.

== Sustainability ==
MADARA products are certified by ECOCERT and packaged in FSC certified, recyclable packaging.

In October 2022, MADARA became the first SME in the Baltic states to partner with the European Bank for Reconstruction and Development (EBRD) to reduce transport CO_{2} emissions by shipping products directly from the manufacturer to the customer.
