= Jump Associates =

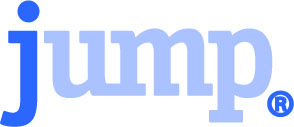
- Company type: Privately Held Company
- Industry: Strategy Consulting
- Founded: 1998
- Founder: Dev Patnaik, Udaya Patnaik, Neal Moore, and Robert Becker
- Headquarters: San Mateo, CA
- Key people: CEO Dev Patnaik
- Number of employees: 50 (2024)
- Website: www.jumpassociates.com

Jump Associates is strategy and innovation consulting firm based in San Mateo, CA. The company was founded in 1998 by CEO Dev Patnaik, Udaya Patnaik, Neal Moore, and Robert Becker. Its business was launched with a project for the office furniture company Steelcase, and its clientele has since scaled to include various Fortune 500 clients.

== Approach and methods ==
Jump Associates takes what it has termed a “hybrid thinking” approach to business strategy, combining elements of management consulting, product design, and “the art of innovation.”

Jump believes that this interdisciplinary approach to strategy and advisory allows them to take a broader and more nuanced view of the business landscape and find innovation opportunities that might otherwise be missed. The firm uses a variety of methods including improv theatre-inspired brainstorming, strategic foresight sessions, ethnographic interviews, and immersion experiences.

== Services and offerings ==
Jump helps clients identify new markets, develop new sources of revenue, and become more purpose-driven. Organizations may hire Jump to “think on [their] behalf,” or to teach them how to generate better ideas through executive training sessions.
