= Vacu Vin =

International Innovation Company
- Company type: Private limited company
- Industry: Retail
- Founded: 1986
- Founder: Bernd Schneider
- Headquarters: Delfgauw, Netherlands
- Area served: Netherlands, United Kingdom, France, Canada, Germany, Spain, Belgium, United States
- Products: Wine accessories
- Website: vacuvin.com

Vacu Vin is the tradename of International Innovation Company, previously named Vacu Vin. The company is manufacturer and distributor of several food and wine related products and has offices in eight countries. Its headquarters are located in Delfgauw, Netherlands.

== History ==
Vacu Vin was founded in 1986 by Bernd Schneider to manufacture and distribute a device that would preserve opened bottles of wine. In the early days the company only manufactured its invention, the Vacu Vin Wine Saver. Wired reviewed the product in 2013, describing it as "The most affordable wine preservation system" that "works better than detractors claim" and that "For short-term storage, Vacu Vin... works fine" but that it is "Completely ineffective after a couple of days" and "At the seven-day mark... completely undrinkable".

Over time the company started designing and manufacturing more food and wine related products, such as corkscrews and carafes. In 2001 Bernd Schneider transferred the company to his sons, Patrick and Stephan. In 2008 the company changed its name to 'International Innovation Company'.
