= Hasso Plattner Institute =

Hasso Plattner Institute may refer to:

- Hasso Plattner Institute for Digital Engineering, an academic institute based in Potsdam, Germany
- Hasso Plattner Institute of Design, a school within Stanford University in California, United States

== See also ==
- Hasso Plattner, a German businessman
