= Human-centered design =

Approach to design that considers human needs at every step of development

Human-centered design, as used in ISO standards, is an approach to problem-solving commonly used in process, product, service and system design, management, and engineering frameworks that develops solutions to problems by involving the human perspective in all steps of the problem-solving process. The approach seeks to develop solutions that are useful, usable, and responsive to the needs, behaviors, and contexts of the people affected by them. Human involvement typically takes place in initially observing the problem within context, brainstorming, conceptualizing, developing concepts and implementing the solution.

Human-centered design is an approach to interactive systems development that aims to make systems usable and useful by focusing on the users, their needs and requirements, and by applying human factors/ergonomics, and usability knowledge and techniques. This approach enhances effectiveness and efficiency, improves human well-being, user satisfaction, accessibility and sustainability; and counteracts possible adverse effects of use on human health, safety and performance.

— ISO 9241-210:2019(E)

Human-centered design builds upon participatory action research by moving beyond participants' involvement and producing solutions to problems rather than solely documenting them. Initial stages usually revolve around immersion, observing, and contextual framing— in which innovators immerse themselves in the problem and community. Subsequent stages may then focus on community brainstorming, modeling and prototyping and implementation in community spaces. Human-centered design can be seen as a philosophy that focuses on analyzing the needs of the user through extensive research. User-oriented design is capable of driving innovation and encourages the practice of iterative design, which can create small improvements in existing products and newer products, thus giving room for the potential to transform markets.

== Development ==
Human-centered design has its origins at the intersection of numerous fields including engineering, psychology, anthropology and the arts. As an approach to creative problem-solving in technical and business fields, its origins are often traced to the founding of the Stanford University design program in 1958 by Professor John E. Arnold who first proposed the idea that engineering design should be human-centered. This work coincided with the rise of creativity techniques and the subsequent design methods movement in the 1960s.

In Architect or Bee?, Mike Cooley coined the term human-centered systems in the context of the transition in his profession from traditional drafting at a drawing board to computer-aided design. Human-centered systems, as used in economics, computing and design, aim to preserve or enhance human skills, in both manual and office work, in environments in which technology tends to undermine the skills that people use in their work.

Human centeredness asserts firstly, that we must always put people before machines, however complex or elegant that machine might be, and, secondly, it marvels and delights at the ability and ingenuity of human beings. The Human Centered Systems movement looks sensitively at these forms of science and technology which meet our cultural, historical and societal requirements, and seeks to develop more appropriate forms of technology to meet our long-term aspirations. In the Human Centered System, there exists a symbiotic relation between the human and the machine, in which the human being would handle the qualitative subjective judgements and the machine the quantitative elements. It involves a radical redesign of the interface technologies and at a philosophical level, the objective is to provide tools (in the Heidegger sense) which would support human skill and ingenuity rather than machines which would objectivise that knowledge

— Mike Cooley, "On Human-Machine Symbiosis", 2008

Since the late twentieth century, human centered design has increasingly been integrated with systems thinking approaches. This has led practitioners to consider user needs as well as the broader social, organizational, and environmental systems in which designed interventions operate.

== User participation ==
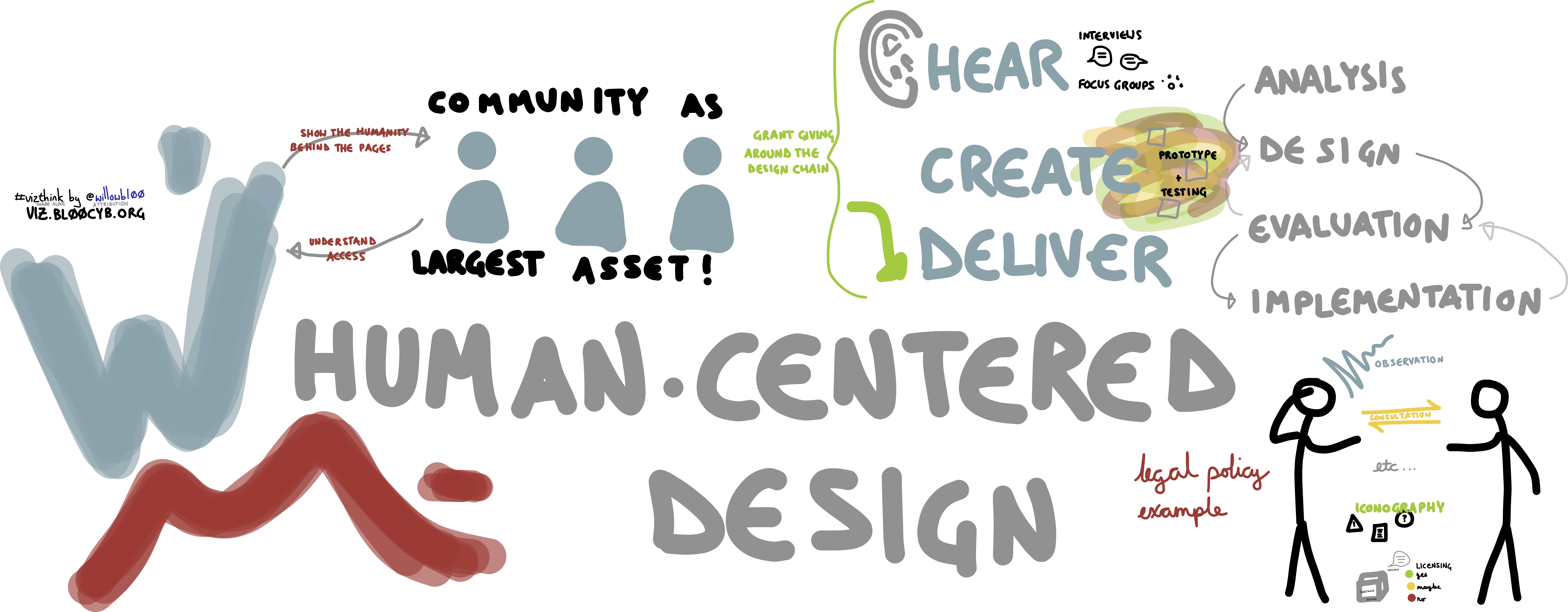
Wikimania Human Centered Design visualization

The user-oriented framework relies heavily on user participation and user feedback in the planning process. Users are able to provide new perspective and ideas, which can be considered in a new round of improvements and changes. It is said that increased user participation in the design process can garner a more comprehensive understanding of the design issues, due to more contextual and emotional transparency between researcher and participant. A key element of human-centered design is applied ethnography, which is a research method adopted from cultural anthropology. This research method requires researchers to be fully immersed in the observation so that implicit details are also recorded.

== Rationale for adoption ==
Using a human-centered approach to design and development has substantial economic and social benefits for users, employers and suppliers. Highly usable systems and products tend to be more successful both technically and commercially. In some areas, such as consumer products, purchasers will pay a premium for well-designed products and systems. Support and help-desk costs are reduced when users can understand and use products without additional assistance. In most countries, employers and suppliers have legal obligations to protect users from risks to their health, and safety and human-centered methods can reduce these risks (e.g. musculoskeletal risks). Systems designed using human-centered methods improve quality, for example, by:

- increasing the productivity of users and the operational efficiency of organizations
- being easier to understand and use, thus reducing training and support costs
- increasing usability for people with a wider range of capabilities and thus increasing accessibility
- improving user experience
- reducing discomfort and stress
- providing a competitive advantage, for example by improving brand image
- contributing towards sustainability objectives

Human-centered design may be utilized in multiple fields, including sociological sciences and technology. It has been noted for its ability to consider human dignity, access, and ability roles when developing solutions. Because of this, human-centered design may more fully incorporate culturally sound, human-informed, and appropriate solutions to problems in a variety of fields rather than solely product and technology-based fields. Because human-centered design focuses on the human experience, researchers and designers can address "issues of social justice and inclusion and encourage ethical, reflexive design."

Human-centered design arises from underlying principles of human factors. Human factors are about discovering the attributes of human cognition and behavior that are important for making technology work for people. It is what allows humans as a species to innovate over time. Human-centered design was used to discover that Blackberries have less human usability than an iPhone and that important controls on a panel that look too similar will be easily confused and may cause an increased risk of human error.

An important distinction between human-centered design and any other form of design is that human-centered design is not just about aesthetics, and is not always designing for interfaces. It could be designing for controls in the world, tasks in the world, hardware, decision-making, or cognition. For instance, if a nurse is too tired from a long shift, they might confuse the pumps through which might be administered a bag of penicillin to a patient. In this case, the human-centered design would encompass a task redesign, a possible institute policy redesign, and an equipment redesign.

Typically, human-centered design is more focused on "methodologies and techniques for interacting with people in such a manner as to facilitate the detection of meanings, desires and needs, either by verbal or non-verbal means." In contrast, user-centered design is another approach and framework of processes which considers the human role in product use, but focuses largely on the production of interactive technology designed around the user's physical attributes rather than social problem-solving.

== Applications ==
Human-centered design is applied across a variety of sectors including product development, service design, healthcare, education, public policy, and organizational transformation. Practitioners often use human-centered methods to address systemic challenges involving multiple stakeholders and interconnected social, technological, and institutional factors.

=== Software engineering ===
In software engineering, Human-centered design is closely connected with requirements engineering, a phase in which developers need to determine what a system must do and whom it is going to serve. As artificial intelligence components are used more and more in everyday software, this concern is also becoming more and more severe. According to Khlood Ahmad and colleagues, many AI-based solutions "focus on technical aspects and ignore critical human-centered aspects." In other words, a system may satisfy all of its functional requirements but leave its users disappointed.

Human-centered design should be addressed in the application of virtual reality.

To solve this problem, Ahmad et al. raised a requirements framework based on industry guidelines on human-centered AI and a user survey. Then, they applied the method to a case study aimed at enhancing the 360-degree video experience for virtual reality users. In another survey of 29 professionals engaged in artificial intelligence projects, the same research team found that most respondents agreed with the idea that human-centered design should be considered during the requirements engineering phase. However, the authors noticed that the tools that most respondents used, such as UML and Microsoft Office, are not suitable for handling artificial intelligence based softwares and may also degrade the quality of the requirements captured. In the cases they researched, the authors discovered that since artificial intelligence has the characteristic called "black box", part of the requirements can not be decided at the beginning of the program. For example, how much can the model improve the quality of the video, and the time and hardware required, these factors can only be decided after a few rounds of training. Thus, the authors suggested using more iretative methods to fit requirement engineering. These findings suggest that the application of human-centered design in software engineering not only depends on developers' intentions but also depends on the tools and documentation practices that the teams rely on.

=== Education ===
Human-centered design has also been considered in higher education, both as a subject of study and as a pedagogical approach. In a 2025 case study, Saadeddine Shehab and colleagues followed 42 undergraduates in a food science capstone course. Students went through phases like understanding, synthesis, ideation, prototyping, and implementation to develop new food products. The authors reported that these activities improved students' knowledge, collaboration, creativity, and metacognitive skills significantly. They recommended that instructors introducing human-centered design into STEM curricula should employ structured scaffolding and iterative feedback.

Similarly, Amy Leman and Rebecca Mott introduced two university courses in agricultural education during the COVID-19 pandemic. These two courses combined human-centered design with traditional program-planning models, with students working in groups online. A survey completed by students indicated that the course had a significant impact on their self-reported human-centered design related skills. 88.9% of the students said that they may use human-centered design during working in the future. Generally speaking, these studies show that human-centered design can be taught outside specific design courses, especially in project-based courses in which students design for real users.

=== Public sector and government services ===
Governments increasingly tend to employ human-centered design to shape public policy and services, which is commonly in the form called "service design".

Kirsty Strokosch and Stephen P. Osborne described service design as improving public services through "a human-centred, iterative and collaborative process of creativity and problem solving". However, they noted that empirical research on how design is actually used in public service contexts was still limited. They further distinguished between the "design of services" and the broader perspective of "designing for service," which they argued that the latter may support deeper transformation. In other words, applying human-centered design in government may involve not only improving specific services but also transforming the way public organizations initially perceive and solve problems. Strokosch and Osborne did research on two examples, the Social Security Service in Scotland and a municipal council in England. What they discovered was that hierarchical decision-making and risk-averse culture limited rapid iteration and creative attempts, so these teams tended to adopt more pragmatic methods rather than inclusive methods, which impeded the use of human-centered design. The authors therefore argued that public service design should adjust the degree of user participation according to the service type instead of using the same pattern.

Based on this distinction, Adam Wellstead and Michael Howlett argued that "designing for service" relied mainly on procedural policy tools, such as public participation processes and public hearings, rather than substantive tools such as regulation and subsidies. They also noted that this approach requires researchers to pay attention to how public value is created at each stage of service delivery. In other words, human-centered design in government depends not only on user research but also on the selection of appropriate administrative and policy instruments.

== In health ==
In the context of health-seeking behaviors, human-centered design can be used to understand why people do or do not seek out health services, even when those services are available and affordable. Human-centered design is a powerful tool for improving health-seeking behaviors. This understanding can then be used to develop interventions to address the barriers and promote desired behaviors. Demand-related challenges associated with the acceptability, responsiveness, and quality of services can be addressed by working directly with users to understand their needs and perspectives. Human-centered design can help in designing interventions that are more likely to be effective. The integration of the principle of human-centered design and anti-racism practices can help in addressing existing health disparities present in the healthcare system, and can help to center the needs of people who being to marginalized communities. This type of design can create fair and equitable health outcomes for marginalized communities, who are often left out due to unmet needs. Researchers who apply human-centered design are thoughtfully approaching the needs of populations who are traditionally excluded, therefore dismantling oppressive systems which previously or have continued to reinforce structural racism.

== Critiques ==
Human-centered design has been praised for promoting user participation in the design process, but scholars and practitioners have also identified potential limitations. One critique is that human-centered design may focus primarily on a limited group of users, which can produce sampling bias and may not fully capture the diversity of perspectives needed for robust design outcomes.

Additionally, relying chiefly on input from current users may constrain the exploration of innovative or future-focused solutions, because participants may struggle to articulate needs for technologies or contexts that do not yet exist.

Research has also highlighted organizational and contextual barriers that can limit the effectiveness of human-centered design methods, including time constraints, competing priorities, and practical limitations within design teams that hinder sustained user engagement.

Finally, some commentators emphasize that focusing on immediate user needs may overlook systems-level, ethical, or long-term considerations, suggesting that human-centered design can be extended with approaches that integrate broader societal and environmental factors.

== Modern advances ==
=== Application in business and change management ===
In the business and organisational change domain, human-centred design methods are increasingly applied to transformation, change management and culture-shifts rather than just product or service design. Organisations embed human-centered design tools such as empathy mapping, stakeholder journey mapping, co-creation workshops and rapid prototyping of change initiatives in order to engage employees and other stakeholders early, foster ownership, reduce resistance and align change solutions with human needs.

The incorporation of human-centered design in organisational change reflects a shift from top-down implementation models to more iterative, participatory frameworks, as businesses operate in rapidly evolving digital, hybrid and agile environments and seek to align technology, culture and human behavior more effectively.

=== Human-centered design with artificial intelligence ===
Human-centered AI (HCAI) is a methodical approach to artificial intelligence system design that prioritizes human values and requirements. This method places a strong emphasis on boosting human self-efficacy, encouraging innovation, guaranteeing accountability, and promoting social interaction. By putting these human goals first, HCAI also tackles important concerns like privacy, security, environmental preservation, social justice, and human rights. This represents a dramatic change from an algorithmic approach to a human-centered system design, which has been compared to a second Copernican Revolution.

HCAI introduces a two-dimensional framework that demonstrates the possibility of combining high levels of human control with high levels of automation. This framework suggests a move away from viewing AI as autonomous teammates, instead positioning AI as powerful tools and tele-operated devices that empower users.

Furthermore, HCAI proposes a three-level governance structure to enhance the reliability and trustworthiness of AI systems. At the first level, software engineering teams are encouraged to develop robust and dependable systems. At the second level, managers are urged to cultivate a safety culture across their organizations. At the third level, industry-wide certification can help establish standards that promote trustworthy HCAI systems.

These concepts are designed to be dynamic, inviting challenge, refinement, and extension to accommodate new technologies. They aim to reframe design discussions for AI products and services, offering an opportunity to restart and reshape these conversations. The ultimate goal is to deliver greater benefits to individuals, families, communities, businesses, and society, ensuring that AI developments align with human values and societal goals

=== Integration of human-centered design and community-based participatory research ===
Joining two people-centered approaches, human-centered design and community-based participatory research (CBPR), offers a way to tackle challenging real-world issues. While CBPR has been used in academic and community partnerships to address health inequities through social action and empowerment, human-centered design has historically been used in the business sector to guide the creation of products and services. The public sector has just started using human-centered design concepts to inform public policy so more research is still needed to fully understand its cycle and how it might be applied to health promotion. By combining CBPR's emphasis on community trust and collaboration with human-centered design's emphasis on user-centric design, this integration provides a complimentary approach. The potential of these approaches to improve public health outcomes is demonstrated by CBPR initiatives, such as those that try to lower the spread of STIs and improve handwashing among farmworkers. The combined strategy can result in more successful and lasting health interventions by addressing pertinent concerns, establishing partnerships, and involving community members.

=== Human-centered design in SEIPS 3.0 ===
In order to improve quality and safety in healthcare, human factors and ergonomics (HFE) are integrated using the Systems Engineering Initiative for Patient Safety (SEIPS) models. These models are based on a human-centered design approach, which gives patients' and healthcare practitioners' wants and experiences top priority when designing systems. By extending the process component to handle the intricacies of contemporary healthcare delivery, SEIPS 3.0 builds upon this.

The idea of the patient journey is introduced by the SEIPS 3.0 model as healthcare becomes more dispersed across different locations and eras. This journey-centric approach emphasizes a comprehensive view of patients' experiences over time by mapping their contacts with various care venues. By emphasizing the patient journey, SEIPS 3.0 emphasizes how crucial it is to create systems that can adapt to patients' changing demands in order to provide seamless, secure, and encouraging care.

In order to implement human-centered design in SEIPS 3.0, HFE professionals must take into account a variety of viewpoints and encourage sincere involvement from all parties involved, including patients, caregivers, and medical professionals. In order to increase interactions across various healthcare settings and capture the intricacies of patient experiences, this approach calls for creative techniques. By putting people first, SEIPS 3.0 seeks to develop healthcare systems that improve the general happiness and well-being of both patients and caregivers in addition to preventing harm.

== Human-centered design in agricultural research for development ==
The field of agricultural research for development has often been criticized for adopting technology-centered approaches, in which innovation is primarily driven by technical feasibility rather than by the needs, capacities, and contexts of intended users. Such approaches may contribute to weak adoption or limit the long-term sustainability of innovations. Human-centered design offers an alternative to this pattern by involving farmers, extension workers, and other intended users throughout the research and design process, rather than treating them as passive recipients of finished technologies.

Beginning in the 1980s, participatory approaches such as farmer-first research and participatory rural appraisal (PRA) were developed in response to the limitations of transfer-of-technology models, in which scientists were assumed to hold superior knowledge and farmers were treated as passive adopters of finished innovations. These approaches, which recognized farmers' local knowledge and agency in the innovation process, became influential within international and national agricultural research systems from the early 1980s through the 2000s. Human-centered design has been described as extending this participatory tradition into a more structured, iterative design process, while also drawing on methods from industrial and interaction design.

Human-centered design approaches in Agriculture for Development (AR4D) aim to develop solutions that are simultaneously desirable, feasible, and viable, based on a framework popularized by the design firm IDEO to describe the intersection of user needs, technical possibility, and business or organizational sustainability. In practice, this involves moving beyond user research to include prototyping and validation. It also positions co-design as a central practice in which researchers take on a more horizontal, facilitative role alongside the community, rather than acting as the primary holders of expertise, and in which solutions are developed through genuine co-creation with community members.

One example is the use of human-centered design to develop climate services. In Guatemala, researchers worked with farmers, agricultural technicians, and institutional partners to identify what climate information users needed, when they needed it, and how it should be delivered. Interviews, user profiles, co-creation workshops, and prototype testing informed the design of agroclimatic bulletins with localized planting guidance, rainfall information, and crop-specific recommendations, distributed through accessible formats and channels such as mobile devices, WhatsApp, radio, maps, and images.

A second example is the redesign of Maano, a mobile marketplace application launched by the World Food Programme (WFP) to connect smallholder farmers in Zambia with buyers. When early monitoring found that farmers struggled with the app's interface, including easily misinterpreted icons and overly complex navigation, WFP partnered with the United Nations Capital Development Fund (UNCDF) and design consultancies to apply a human-centered design process, conducting field interviews with farmers and iteratively testing interface prototypes. Field research and prototype testing led to simplified terminology, locally understandable icons, more flexible user profiles, and proposed services such as weather forecasts, market prices, financial services, and farming advice. The recommended changes were validated through in-field prototyping, although the source does not report post-rollout usability or adoption results. Before the redesign, however, Maano had already expanded from 46 farmer representatives to 114 and facilitated the sale of 6,600 bags of crops worth more than ZMW 1.2 million. Attention to farmers' digital literacy and local context, rather than interface conventions imported from other markets, shaped the features that were prioritized.

== Relationship to design thinking ==
Human-centered design is closely associated with design thinking and is often considered a foundational element of design thinking methodologies. Both emphasize empathy, iterative development, prototyping, and testing; however, human-centered design is generally defined by its focus on understanding and responding to human needs throughout the design process.

== See also ==
- Design thinking
- Human-Centered Artificial Intelligence
- Humanistic economics
- Neuroinclusive design
- User-centered design
