= Social Teeth =

Crowd funding website

- Website type: Crowd funding
- Available in: English
- Website: www.socialteeth.org
- Launched: June 2012
- Current status: Defunct

Social Teeth was a crowd funding website that allowed users to raise money for independently produced advertising campaigns.

== History ==
Social Teeth was founded in June 2012 by Stanford graduate Elaine Chang. Chang developed the idea in late 2011, frustrated by the disproportionate influence of super PACs and other moneyed special interests on the airwaves. In an interview with The Guardian Chang stated: "In an election season dominated by big money from small numbers of people, I wanted to give all of us the chance to get involved and fight against the influence of big money in politics." Steve Hilton, former director of strategy for British Prime Minister David Cameron, soon joined as an advisor to the organization.

The site was one of four winning entries in a competition held by Stanford's d.school Institute of Design, gaining a presentation slot in the Aspen Ideas Festival, an annual gathering of global intellectual leaders put on by the Aspen Institute.

Social Teeth's first round of ads consisted of six video campaigns chosen through a public voting contest. The ad campaigns ranged from support of marriage equality to Libertarian presidential candidate Gary Johnson.

As of February 2026, the Social Teeth website is inactive and redirects to an unrelated page.

== Funding Model ==
The Social Teeth platform worked much like Kickstarter. Users submitted independently produced broadcast-quality ads which had already gained popularity on social media networks like Facebook or Twitter to the Social Teeth website. Supporters then pledged money to particular campaigns. If the ad was funded on time, Social Teeth purchased spots on other media channels such as TV and online advertisements, with the assistance of partner organization Aegis Group, a global media buying firm.

== See also ==
- Change.org
- Comparison of crowd funding services
- Kickstarter
