= Rolf Faste =

American industrial designer (1943–2003)

Rolf Arne Faste
- Born: September 6, 1943; Seattle, Washington, U.S.
- Died: March 6, 2003 (aged 59)
- Education: Stevens Institute of Technology; Tufts University; Syracuse University
- Scientific career
- Fields: Design, mechanical engineering, architecture

Rolf A. Faste (1943–2003) was an American designer who made major contributions to the fields of human-centered design and design education. He is best known for his contributions to design thinking which he advanced as a 'whole person' approach to problem solving centered on the perception of needs. He was professor of industrial design at the Syracuse University from 1971 to 1983, and professor of mechanical engineering and director of the Stanford Joint Program in Design from 1984 to 2003.

== Early life and education ==
Faste was born in Seattle, Washington, the eldest child of Andreas Faste, a naval architect noted for his work on the MV Coho ferry, and Edith Morch Faste, an artist. Interested from a young age with the intersection between art and engineering, he earned a bachelor's degree in mechanical engineering from Stevens Institute of Technology in 1965, a master's degree in engineering design from Tufts University in 1971, and a second bachelor's degree in architecture from Syracuse University in 1977. Faste's graduate thesis work at Tufts on engineering creativity was advised by William J. J. Gordon, the originator of Synectics, and demonstrated a correlation between an individual's creative ability when working on science and engineering problems and their capacity to visualize solution concepts.

== Career ==
Faste was a professor of design at Syracuse University from 1971 to 1984, where he taught classes on rapid visualization, prototyping, materials, computer-aided design, aesthetics and the creative process. He was active in the field of accessible design in the early 1970s, and as research associate on the ANSI A117 project he co-authored the national standards for accessibility to buildings. During this time he also served as an UNESCO consultant to the Indian Institute of Technology, Bombay, India.

At Stanford Faste was noted for his contributions to engineering education and design research, developing courses to strengthen students' visual and creative skills such as Aesthetics of Machinery, Ambidextrous Thinking and Expression of Function. He was interested in exploring the way that the body and mind influence technical creativity, understanding needs and cultural meaning in the creation of products, and incorporating functional, aesthetic and humanistic concerns in design. He was a recipient of the Raymond J. Perrin Award for Teaching and Course Development, and held five patents and one patent pending for his innovations.

== Foundation ==
In 2009, Faste's sons founded the Rolf A. Faste Foundation for Design Creativity, a non-profit center for creativity research. The foundation is dedicated to furthering Rolf's vision of design as a way of being in the world for the betterment of human society and mind.

== Legacy ==
The Faste Laboratory, a centre for innovation in the area of functional products at Luleå University of Technology, Sweden, was named in his memory.
