= Metaphor Computer Systems =

American computer company

- Industry: Computers
- Founded: 1982; 44 years ago in Mountain View, California
- Founders: David Liddle; Donald Massaro
- Defunct: 1994
- Fate: Acquired by IBM in 1991
- Successor: Meta5
- Products: Computer workstations and software

Metaphor Computer Systems (1982–1994) was an American computer company that created an advanced workstation, database gateway, unique graphical office interface, and software applications that "seamlessly integrate" data from both internal and external sources. The Metaphor machine was one of the first commercial workstations to offer a complete hardware/software package and a GUI, including "a wireless mouse and a wireless five-function key pad". Although the company achieved some commercial success, it never achieved the fame of either the Apple Macintosh or Microsoft Windows.

== History ==
David Liddle and Donald Massaro founded Metaphor in 1982 after leaving Xerox PARC. By 1987, the company had an annual revenue of $39.7 million. In 1991, IBM, one of its primary customers, acquired the company outright.

=== Patriot Partners ===
Metaphor and IBM created a venture called Patriot Partners in 1990, the same year Metaphor ceased selling its own hardware and instead "market Metaphor's business analysis software for use on" the IBM PS/2.

The attempt was to create an organization that could produce a solid business line of object-oriented software. Rather than capitalize the venture, IBM purchased the Metaphor software division in 1991 and operated it as a wholly owned, independent subsidiary, and the hardware and field repair division was spun off into its own company, Sequence Support Services. In May 1993, Sequence Support Services ceased operations. In October 1994, Metaphor ceased operations.

=== Meta5 ===
In March 2000, IBM licensed the Metaphor IBM Intelligent Decision Server (IDS) technology to Relational Development Systems (RDS), which was renamed Meta5.

== Product overview ==
=== Hardware ===
Released in September 1984, the Metaphor workstation had infrared wireless input devices: keyboard, mouse, numeric pad, and five-function keypad. Logitech designed Metaphor’s first cordless mouse using infrared technology, making the workstation an early testbed for wireless computer input before such peripherals became common. This was the first commercial appearance of cordless input devices like mouse, etc. The input devices docked in the desktop workstation where they were recharged, or could be attached individually by removable cords to the workstation, if needed. Objects on the desktop and open applications had a uniform command set that could be controlled by the keypad which had Copy, Move, Delete, Options, and Size. The workstations were Motorola 68000-based, networked with Ethernet, and contained 1 MB RAM.

The industrial design of the workstation was done by Mike Nuttall of Matrix Product Design. It won a gold medal from the IDSA. The workstation itself was engineered by James Yurchenco at David Kelley Design. Both Matrix and David Kelley Design were precursors of IDEO.

Two different workstations models were produced. Workstation One had an external electronics enclosure. Workstation Two had integrated electronics. Workstation Three, which included a color screen, was designed through final prototypes, but was never taken into production.

In August 1988, the Workstation 2XP was released which adapted a standard PC into a Metaphor workstation using a 68000-based co-processor card with 2 MB RAM, Ethernet adapter, three-button mouse, and 15-inch color monitor.

Metaphor released 80386-based workstations in July 1989: 16 MHz 386SX-based Model 216 and 20 MHz 386-based Model 220, each with 4 MB RAM.

=== GUI Origins ===
Xerox PARC in 1973 began development of the Alto, widely shown in 1979. The Alto was the first computer with a bitmap display, mouse and a desktop metaphor as a graphical user interface (GUI). Xerox commercialized it as the Xerox Star.

=== DIS ===
The Metaphor GUI provided a unique visualization of end-to-end elements in an enterprise. In total, Metaphor branded this as a Data Interpretation System (DIS), which is a class of Decision Support System (DSS) The DIS software was designed to show in one workflow, the access of data from SQL databases, its analysis and then its presentation. This was accomplish by using graphically iconic applications for database gateway, spreadsheet, plot, email, and printing tools all connected by arrows. These were animated when the workflow ran. The workflow collection was called a Capsule.

=== Capsule ===
The heart of the Metaphor DIS system was the Capsule. Basically, a capsule was a simplified BATCH program. Because Metaphor applications were built so they communicated with each other, they could be moved into a folder and automated in a "Capsule". (The name was taken from the crewed space capsules of the time.)

The functionality of the Word Processor, Spreadsheet, and Data Retrieval tools were no better than their Microsoft Office counterparts (in fact, they had a smaller sub-set of features than Office). The primary advantage of Metaphor's system was the degree to which applications were linked together. Complex reiterative data-retrieval jobs were able to be created on-the-fly by a user with no programming knowledge.

A user could visually drag fields from multiple databases into the Data Retrieval tool (which would generate its own SQL code based on the fields, links and criteria displayed) and send the output directly into a spreadsheet for sorting, calculations, and graphs. The report could then be sent into a pre-formatted Word Processing document, sent to the printer, and even e-mailed to a pre-designated distribution list. The whole process would repeat for each SKU, Region, Price Code, etc. without any human interaction.
