= Datascope Analytics =

American data consultation company

- Company type: Privately held company
- Industry: Marketing
- Founded: 2009; 16 years ago
- Founders: Mike Stringer and Dean Malmgren
- Defunct: 2017
- Fate: Acquired
- Successor: Ideo
- Headquarters: Chicago, United States
- Area served: America
- Services: Data driven consulting and design
- Website: datascopeanalytics.com

Datascope Analytics was an American data-driven consulting and design firm based in Chicago, Illinois. The firm was founded in 2009 by co-founders Mike Stringer and Dean Malmgren after the two realized the lodes that could be extracted from data science. The company was acquired in 2017 by design firm Ideo.

In addition to analyzing massive amounts of data, the firm built useful tools for people, organizations and companies to learn from data, and be more quantitative in how they approach different problems. Their data science services include strategy consulting, software development and training.

== History ==
Datascope was founded in 2009 by Mike Stringer and Dean Malmgren. Stringer received a BS in Engineering Physics from the University of Colorado and a PhD in Physics from Northwestern University. Malmgren received a BS from the University of Michigan and a PhD in Chemical and Biological Engineering from Northwestern University, where he was a research fellow alongside Stringer. It was during their time at Northwestern that they began to realize the lodes that could be extracted from data science, more specifically, the useful tools they can provide people, organization and companies.

The company had worked with industry leaders like Thomson Reuters, Procter & Gamble, Motorola, Kaplan, Daegis, and the Detroit Pistons, to emerging tech companies and nonprofits.

In 2011, Datascope began the Data Science Chicago Meetup, which now has over 3,635 members, as well as Data Science Madison, founded in 2014, which currently has 363 active members. The group discussions range from tutorials on new technologies and their applications to success stories from practitioners, as well as cutting-edge academic data science and social activities. In 2016, they founded a Chicago Women in Machine Learning and Data Science team. The Meetup discusses machine learning and data science in an informal setting with the purpose of learning about top-notch research and technology, while building a community around women in these fields.

In 2014, Datascope launched a data science boot camp for New York-based Metis, part of the Kaplan education network, helping others accelerate their data science careers. Datascope helped create the curriculum. Recently, Kaplan expanded their data science boot camp into the San Francisco and Chicago market, still utilizing Datascope's curriculum as a basis.

In 2017, the company was acquired by American design form Ideo.

== Culture ==
Bootstrapped since their inception, Datascope worked out of Northwestern University's Farley Center for Entrepreneurship and Innovation their first year in business. Unlike most companies that have predetermined hierarchy, Datascope quickly adopted a completely flat company structure, which gives each employee the same monthly salary, and allows each employee the opportunity to take on a leadership role. These roles are chosen based on whichever employee finds a particular project to be the most mentally and creatively stimulating. To ensure this, Datascope custom-built an operating agreement to retain a flat organizational structure that reflects the company's culture.
