= German University of Digital Science =

Fully digital university in Potsdam (Germany)

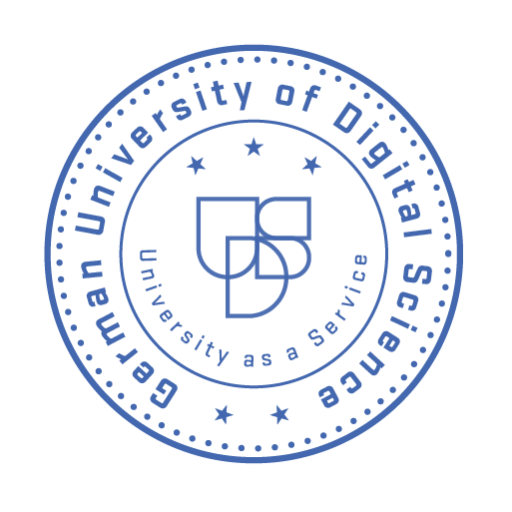
- Other name: German UDS
- Motto: University as a Service
- Established: April 1, 2025
- Founders: Mike Friedrichsen & Christoph Meinel
- Accreditation: Deutscher Akkreditierungsrat
- President: Mike Friedrichsen & Christoph Meinel
- Total staff: 40
- Location: Potsdam, Brandenburg, Germany
- Language: English
- Website: german-uds.de

The German University of Digital Science, or German UDS for short, is a fully digital university in Germany based in the media city of Babelsberg in Potsdam. The term “Digital Science” subsumes the new subject areas emerging in traditional subject areas as a result of advancing digitalization (e.g. Digital Humanities, Digital Health) and the new and emerging subject areas created by digital technologies (e.g. Computer Science, Artificial Intelligence). The study programs focus on digital science, artificial intelligence, cybersecurity, virtual and augmented reality technologies, and digital transformation. Research at German UDS is organized in research centers.

== Profile ==
The German UDS is aimed at scientists and learners worldwide who want to actively shape the digital transformation and the creation of a digital world worth living in and loving according to humanistic values. Students are particularly targeted at people who are unable to study in person for financial, professional or family reasons. With its globally usable offer, the German UDS helps to counteract the global shortage of IT specialists and thus promotes global economic development.

The German UDS is characterized by the following features:

- Research and teaching in the field of digital science with a focus on digital transformation and technologies.
- Completely digital, English-language teaching without compulsory attendance.
- Use of MOOC-based teaching formats and learning platform technologies for worldwide interaction.
- Global orientation with a focus on students from the Global South.
- Continuing education and professional qualification offers to help shape a humanitarian digital world.

== Foundation and accreditation ==
The German UDS was founded by the computer science professors Mike Friedrichsen and Christoph Meinel.

The German Science and Humanities Council has recommended that the Land Brandenburg be recognized as a fully digital university in the field of digital science on the basis of the concept submitted by both. The Ministry of Science, Research and Culture (MWFK) Brandenburg officially recognized the German UDS in February 2025. The German Accreditation Council has accredited all study programs of the German UDS. It began its teaching and research operations on April 1, 2025 with the appointment and nomination of first professors.

== Study programs ==
The thematic focus of the study programs at the German UDS is on digital science, artificial intelligence, cybersecurity, XR technologies and digital transformation. The individual modules of the study programs can also be completed independently of these as micro-degree programs with an ECTS degree. This enables the German UDS to make a significant contribution to continuing professional development and lifelong learning.

The following study options are offered:

- 1-year MBA study programs (MBA) for
  - Digital Transformation
  - Digital Technologies
- 2-year Master of Science (M.Sc) study programs in
  - Applied AI
  - Cybersecurity
  - Advanced Digital Reality
  - Digital Leadership
- 3-month micro-degree programs for professional development with a 5 ECTS degree,
- Free open courses on digital education

Studies at the German UDS are organized in quarters. The study programs start on 1 April and 1 October each year, the application deadline is 15 March and 15 September respectively. The micro-degree programs are also offered twice a year and start at the beginning of each quarter.

The first programs of the German UDS have started in April 2025. In addition to the technical content, the courses will also teach the basics of law and ethics and promote teamwork, social skills and flexibility. Great importance is attached to teaching design thinking. The tuition fees are calculated in a fair and non-profit manner. With its digital study model and tuition fees of €7,500 per year, the German UDS aims to give students from the Global South in particular the opportunity to obtain a German university degree. The university also awards scholarships. This makes the German UDS the first state-recognized university in Europe to offer a fully-fledged German university degree exclusively in digital form.

== Design and Entrepreneurship Colleges ==
In addition to the Research Centers, there are two colleges, the College of Design Thinking, and the College of Entrepreneurship.

== University as a Service ==
Thanks to its digital study programs, German UDS can offer other universities in Germany and abroad what is referred to in cloud language as "University as a Service". If a university cannot offer its students certain study modules itself due to a lack of staff or expertise and these are part of the German UDS study programs, students at the other university can complete these modules offered digitally by the German UDS from anywhere. The completion of these study modules can then be recognized by their home university. Other universities can also offer their particularly talented students a so-called double degree by allowing them to complete a study program at German UDS digital in parallel to the study program at their home university.

== Research ==
Research at the German UDS is organized in Research Centers. The professors associate themselves with the Research Center relevant to their topic for scientific exchange and cooperation and in future will also jointly supervise their doctoral students in the Research Center's PhD School. The German UDS conducts its research in the following Research Centers:

- Digital Science
- Cybersecurity
- Learning Analytics und Digital Education
- Advanced Virtual Environments
- Artificial Intelligence

== Organization ==
The German University of Digital Science Foundation is a state-recognized foundation of the State of Berlin, which pursues exclusively and indirectly non-profit purposes and was founded to support research and teaching at the German UDS 2021. It is the majority shareholder of the supporting company German University of Digital Science gGmbH. German UDS Innovation GmbH offers interested companies and organizations the opportunity to participate in the commercialization of scientific findings and innovations developed by the professors, scientists and students of German UDS as an investment company. German UDS is open to strategic partnerships for universities, companies and others.

The German UDS is led by two presidents, who are elected by the Council of the University for 6 years at the suggestion of the Advisory Board of the German UDS. The Advisory Board, which consists of world-leading experts from the university and digital sector, advises the German UDS on strategically important issues. The relevant issues in research and teaching are decided in academic self-administration by the Council of the German UDS.

== Location and infrastructure ==
Due to its fully digitally organized research and teaching operations, the German UDS can dispense with a classic campus in favor of providing a comprehensive and powerful digital infrastructure' The CloudHouse in the media city of Babelsberg in Potsdam is the headquarters and powerhouse of the German UDS. It houses the necessary technical infrastructure for its global research and teaching operations. Among many other digital communication and collaboration systems, the German UDS uses the campus management system Full Fabric and the learning management system Open edX.

== Quality ranking ==
In a ranking by the Süddeutsche Zeitung of the best private German universities in 2026, German UDS was rated the best university in terms of international orientation; in terms of practical relevance, the quality of its graduates, reputation/image, innovative strength and future orientation, as well as subject/thematic focus, it achieved the rating ‘Top’ (it was among the top 10).

Translated with DeepL.com (free version)
