= Hasso Plattner Institute of Design =

School at Stanford University founded in 2004

The Hasso Plattner Institute of Design, branded as d.school, is a degree-granting institute at Stanford University. It offers a BS in Design degree program and a two-year MS in Design degree program, along with university-wide elective courses.

The school was founded by David M. Kelley and Bernard Roth in 2004 and was named after German businessman Hasso Plattner.

== History ==
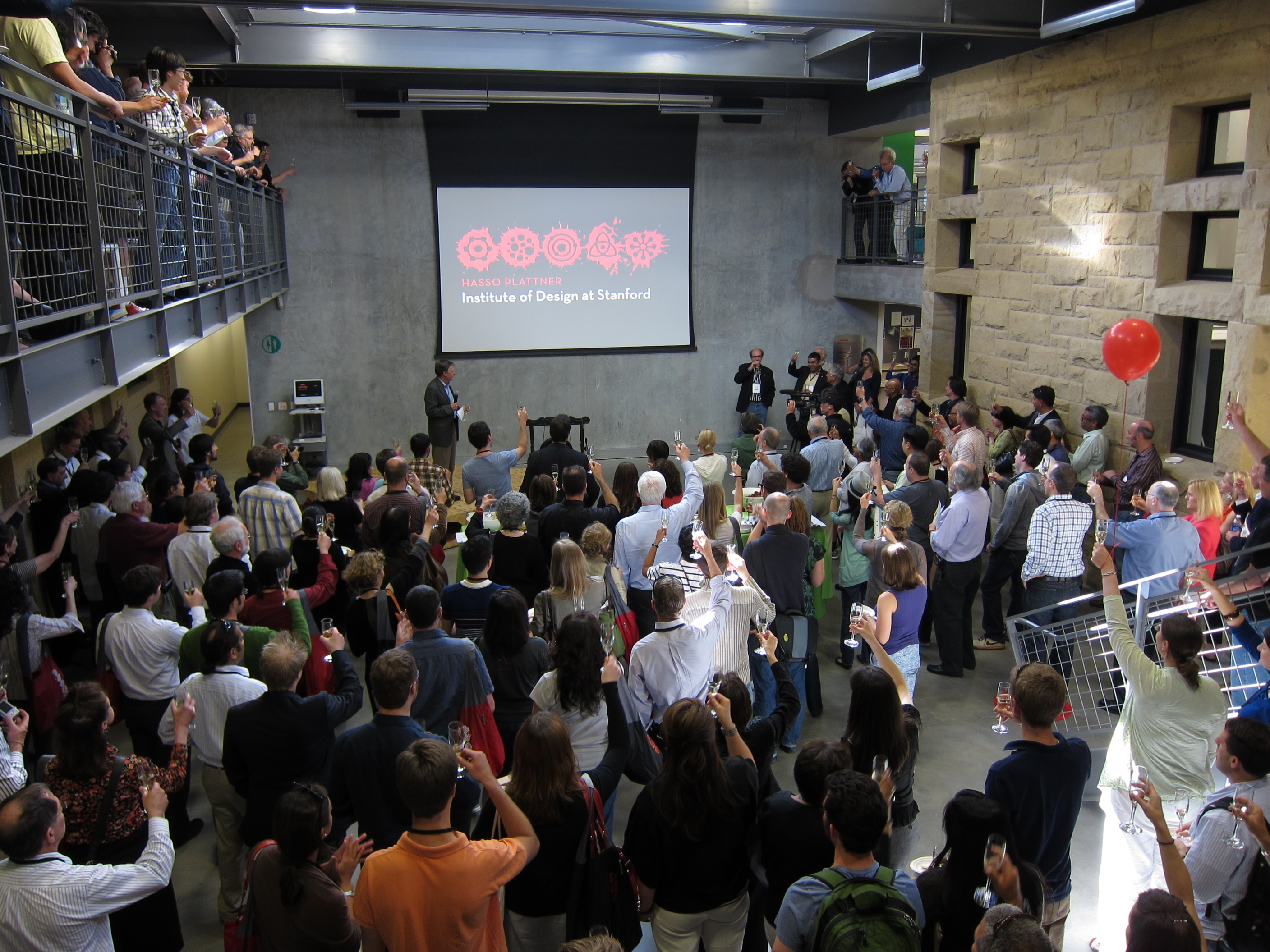
d.school opening ceremony, 2010.

The institute was founded by Stanford mechanical engineering professor David M. Kelley, Bernard Roth, Terry Winograd, and five other professors in 2004. On 3 October 2005, the institute was formally inaugurated as the Hasso Plattner Institute of Design. The program integrates business, law, medicine, social sciences, and humanities with more traditional engineering and product design education.

The institute is named after Hasso Plattner, co-founder of SAP, who contributed US$35 million towards its inception. The institute cooperates closely with its sister institute the Hasso Plattner Institute for Digital Engineering in Potsdam, Germany.

In 2008, Plattner provided $16 million in funding for the initial eight-year joint Stanford-HPI Design Thinking Research Program.

According to The New York Times, the d.school has become one of the most highly sought academic programs at Stanford. To meet the demand, it is adding full courses and pop-up classes, which focus on more specific problems.

In March 2010, the d.school relocated into a new 40,000 square-foot building and held the ribbo-cutting ceremony on 7 May 2010. The new building houses not only the d.school, but also other Stanford design programs.

== Products ==
The institute's products include Embrace, a low-cost alternative to neonatal incubators, and the d.light, an energy-efficient LED light now in use in some rural communities in Africa and Asia. The Pulse News Reader app was developed in a d.school class in 2010, and became the highest-selling mobile app in Apple's App Store in June 2010. In April 2013, LinkedIn acquired Pulse, with its more than 30 million registered users, for $90 million.

== See also ==
- Stanford University
- Stanford Center for Design Research
- Stanford Joint Program in Design
