= David M. Kelley =

American businessman (born 1951)

- David M. Kelley in 2026
- Born: February 10, 1951 (age 75); Barberton, Ohio, U.S.
- Education: Carnegie Mellon University (BS); Stanford University (MS)
- Occupations: Businessman, designer, engineer, professor
- Known for: Engineering design, founder of Hasso Plattner Institute of Design at Stanford University
- Relatives: Tom Kelley (brother)

David M. Kelley (born February 10, 1951) is an American engineer, designer, businessman, and educator. He is co-founder of the design firm IDEO and a professor at Stanford University. He has received several honors for his contributions to design and design education.

== Early life and education ==
Kelley was born in Barberton, Ohio. His brother is Tom Kelley, who later became general manager of IDEO and author of The Art of Innovation and The Ten Faces of Innovation.

David M. Kelley received a Bachelor of Science with a major in electrical engineering from Carnegie Mellon University in 1973. He received a Master of Science in design from Stanford University in 1977.

He was a member of the Sigma Alpha Epsilon fraternity at CMU. He is married to Katharine C. Branscomb, a former CEO of IntelliCorp, whom he met through mutual friend Steve Jobs.

== Career ==
=== Industry ===
Kelley began work as an engineer, first at Boeing and later at NCR. At Boeing, he was responsible for the design of the Lavatory Occupied sign for the 747 airplane. This experience led him to return to school. In 1977, he earned his master's degree from the Joint Program in Design at Stanford University, popularly called the Product Design program. In 1978, he partnered with another Stanford Product Design graduate, Dean Hovey, to form Hovey-Kelley Design. Hovey left to pursue other interests and the firm was renamed "David Kelley Design" (DKD).

In 1984, he co-founded Onset Ventures, an early-stage venture capital firm. He also co-founded Edge Innovations, the special-effects company responsible for the whales in the Free Willy movies, among many other film credits. In 1991, Kelley merged DKD with three other design firms (Mike Nuttall's Matrix Product Design in Palo Alto, ID TWO in San Francisco, and Moggridge Associates in London, the latter two founded by Bill Moggridge) to create IDEO, which he ran as CEO until 2000.

=== Education ===
Kelley began teaching in the Stanford Product Design program in 1978, after earning his master's. He was briefly a PhD student. In 1990, he became a tenured professor, and was named the Donald W. Whittier Professor in Mechanical Engineering in 2002. In 2004, Kelley led the creation of the Hasso Plattner Institute of Design at Stanford University, known as the "d.school." For his contributions to the practice and study of design, Kelley has been awarded honorary doctorate degrees from Carnegie Mellon University, Dartmouth and ArtCenter College of Design.

== Reception ==
David Kelley has been recognized as one of America's leading design innovators.

In 2020, he received the Bernard M. Gordon Prize for Innovation in Engineering and Technology Education from the National Academy of Engineering “for formalizing the principles and curriculum of ‘design thinking’ to develop innovative engineering leaders with empathy and creative confidence to generate high-impact solutions.”

In 2019, he was conferred an honorary Doctor of Science and Technology by his alma mater, Carnegie Mellon University.

In 2013, David and his brother Tom Kelley published Creative Confidence, which a Forbes review called "an empowering, compelling, relentlessly hopeful and optimistic read."

In 2012, Kelley spoke on building creative confidence at TED 2012. He had earlier spoken at TED 2002 on human-centered design.

In 2009, he was awarded the Edison Achievement Award for his "pioneering contributions to the design of breakthrough products, services, and experiences for consumers, as well as his development of an innovative culture that has broad impact."

In 2005, he was recognized for his "distinguished contribution to design education" with the Sir Misha Black Medal.

In 2001, the Smithsonian Institution's Cooper-Hewitt, National Design Museum presented David Kelley and IDEO with the National Design Award in Product Design.

In 2000, he was honored with a Chrysler Design Award, and was elected to the National Academy of Engineering for "the creation of products of diversity and for affecting the practice of design."
