= Mike Nuttall =

British designer

Mike Nuttall is a British designer who established Matrix Product Design in 1983 in Palo Alto, California. In 1991, his company merged with two other established design firms, David Kelley Design (founded by David Kelley) and ID Two (founded by Bill Moggridge) to form the influential design firm IDEO.

Nuttall studied at Leicester College of Art & Design, getting his BA degree in Industrial Design. He continued at Royal College of Art in London receiving his MA degree.

He moved to the United States in 1980. From 1983 to 1991, his firm, Matrix Product Design, won more than twenty design awards. After joining IDEO, he led development efforts that resulted in many successful computer, consumer, and medical products with major corporations from the US, Europe, and Asia.

Among his other roles at IDEO, he founded and managed IDEO Ventures, an internal venture capital fund that made strategic equity and royalty investments in IDEO's client partners. He has also taught in numerous academic institutions.

== Products designed ==
- Convergent Technologies IWS computer system (1981)
- Convergent Technologies AWS workstation (1981)
- Convergent Technologies WorkSlate (1983)
- Convergent Technologies NGEN computer system (1984)
- Metaphor Computer Systems workstation (1984)
- AT&T UNIX PC computer (1985)
- AT&T Personal Terminal 510 (1985)
- "Dove Bar" Microsoft Mouse (1987)
- Plus Development Passport removable hard drive (1988)
- Apple Macintosh IIsi (1990)
- Apple Macintosh Quadra 700 (1991)
- Apple Macintosh Quadra 900 (1991)
- Apple LaserWriter Select (1993)
- SGI Indy workstation (1993)
