= Christoph Meinel =

German computer scientist

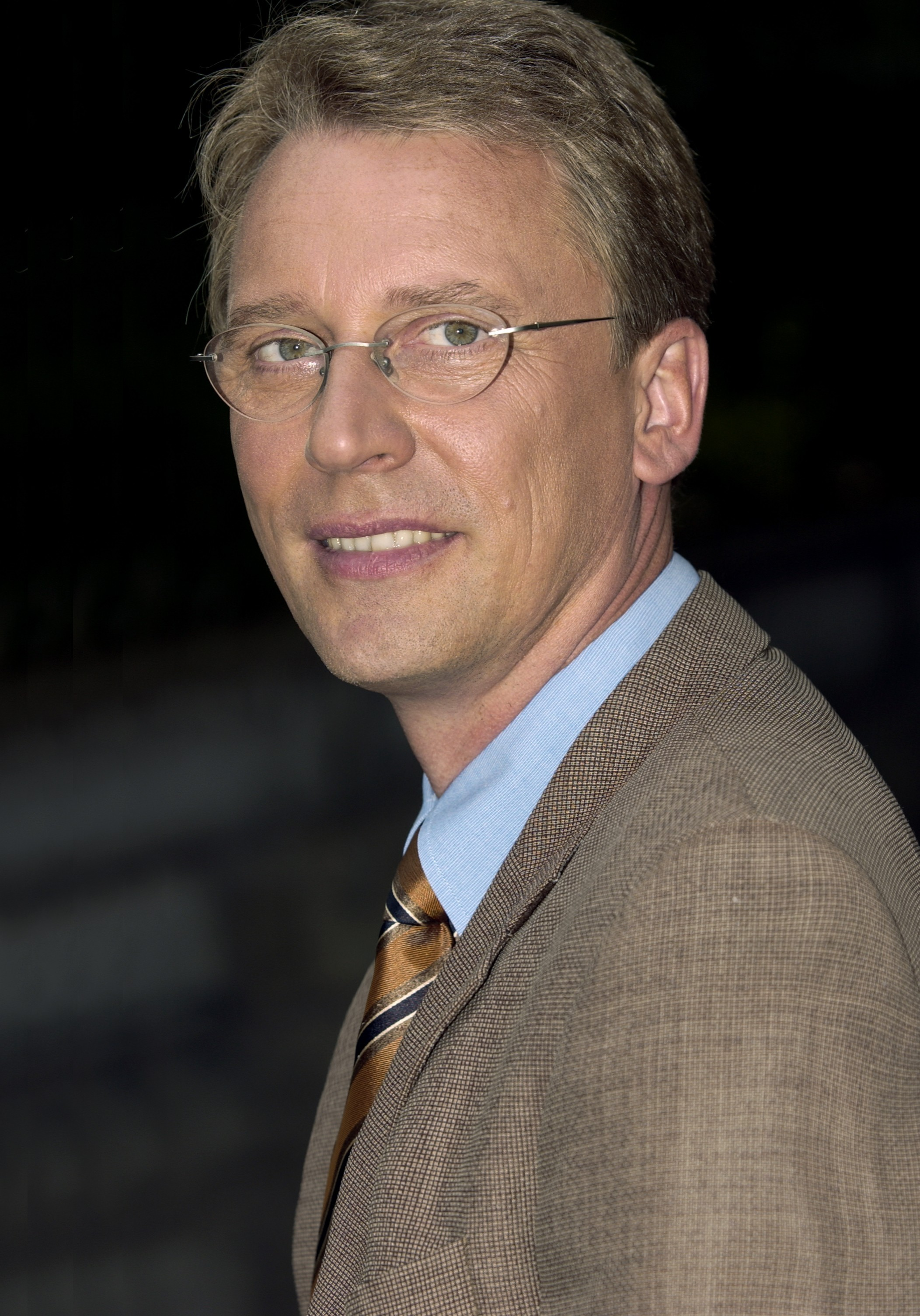
- Born: 14 April 1954 (age 72); Meißen, Germany
- Education: Humboldt-University, Berlin
- Known for: openHPI, Internet technologies and systems
- Scientific career
- Fields: Computer Science
- Workplaces: German University of Digital Science; Hasso Plattner Institute, University of Potsdam
- Website: prof-dr-christoph-meinel.de

Christoph Meinel (born April 14, 1954 in Meißen, Germany) is a German computer scientist and professor emeritus of Internet technologies. He is one of the two founding presidents of the German University of Digital Science and has been one of the two presidents since its foundation in April 2025. Previously, he was Institute Director and CEO at the Hasso Plattner Institute (HPI) at the University of Potsdam from 2004 to 2023. Meinel is the author of numerous specialist books on the internet and web technology as well as an editor. He has developed the openHPI learning platform with more than 1 million enrolled learners. In 2019, he was appointed to the New Internet IPv6 Hall of Fame.

== Academic life ==
Meinel passed his Abitur (equivalent to A-level) in 1973 and began studying mathematics and computer science at the Humboldt University of Berlin in 1974, graduating in 1979. This was followed by research studies there, which he completed in 1981 with a doctorate as Dr. rer. nat. and he subsequently became a research assistant there. In 1988, Humboldt-Universität zu Berlin awarded him the Facultas Docendi (the habitation teaching qualification). In the same year habilitated at the German Academy of Sciences at Berlin with the publication Modified Branching Programs and Their Computational Power and became a senior research assistant at the Humboldt University.

After a full professorship (C4 in German) for “Practical Computer Science” at the University of Paderborn in the summer semester of 1991, he was appointed to a full professorship for “Theoretical Concepts and New Applications of Computer Science” at the University of Trier on April 1, 1992. In 1996, he also became deputy director of the Fraunhofer Institute for “Industrial Mathematics” (ITWM) in Kaiserslautern and was entrusted with the development of its Trier division. In 1998, under his leadership, this Trier division of the ITWM was spun off into an independent “Institute for Telematics” supervised by the Fraunhofer Management Gesellschaft, which dealt with issues relating to the new Internet and web technology. After three years of work, a 50-strong team could point to two patents, several doctorates and almost 70 specialist contributions to international conferences.

In 2004, Meinel was appointed Institute Director and CEO at the Hasso Plattner Institute for Digital Engineering (HPI) and moved to the University of Potsdam, where he held the Chair of Internet Technologies and Systems. He headed the HPI until his retirement in March 2023.

In 2017, he became the founding dean of the Digital Engineering Faculty at the University of Potsdam. This is the first privately funded faculty of a public university in Germany to be founded jointly by the university and HPI. This foundation ended successfully in 2021.

Together with Mike Friedrichsen, he founded a fully digital university, the German University of Digital Science. This began operations in April 2025 and he is one of the two presidents together with Friedrichsen.

From 1995 to 2007, he was a member of the Scientific Directorate of the International Meeting and Research Center for Computer Science IBFI Schloss Dagstuhl. He was a visiting professor and senior research fellow at the University of Luxembourg (2002-2010), is Honorary Professor at the School of Computer Sciences at Beijing University of Technology and Visiting Professor at the Universities of Shanghai and Dalian.

Meinel is a member of acatech, the German National Academy of Science and Engineering, and serves on the Board of Governors of the Technion in Haifa, among many other academic bodies. He is a teacher at the HPI School of Design Thinking and on the MOOC platform openHPI

== Research and development ==
Meinel's work initially focused on theoretical computer science, and here on complexity theory and binary decision diagrams. He later worked on Internet technologies, IT security as well as digital education and new forms of teaching and learning on the Internet, such as teleteaching and e-learning with tele-TASK and openHPI.

He has also conducted research on information and Internet security issues, e.g. lock-keeper network protection, protection against unwanted and offensive content and security in service-based architectures with applications in telemedicine. In the field of artificial intelligence, he developed and investigated energy- and memory-saving low-bit artificial neural networks for deep learning. He is also scientifically involved with questions of knowledge management on the Internet and new forms of Internet-based teaching and learning tele-TASK. In innovation research, he has conducted research on Design Thinking and was program director of the HPI-Stanford Design Thinking Research Program (HPDTRP) together with Larry Leifer from 2008-2022. (HPDTRP).

The first European MOOCs platform openHPI, which he initiated and developed under his leadership, offers free interactive online courses on digital education and technologies. More than 1.2 million learners from all over the world are enrolled (as of Oct. 2023) and can also earn qualified certificates for successfully completing online courses. The identity of course participants is verified via webcam. The openHPI platform is now also used by other partners, such as openWHO, openSAP, KI-Campus or eGov-Campus.

Meinel is also involved in the field of digital education in schools and chairs nationwide working groups that develop concepts and secure digital working environments for the learning of the future. The projects “Bildungscloud” and HPI Schul-Cloud, which enables low-threshold and data protection-compliant access to digital educational offerings in German schools. The HPI School Cloud, which was funded by the German federal ministry of education and Research (BMBF) from 2016-2021 and developed under its leadership, is now operated by Dataport AöR and is used in many thousands of schools in all federal states, especially in Thuringia, Brandenburg and Lower Saxony. Pupils and teachers can use it to access digital teaching materials, communicate digitally, securely store and exchange texts, presentations and data and access educational software from the internet under a pseudonym. In 2022, he developed a new school subject “Digital World” for the Hessian Ministry of Education and Cultural Affairs.

Meinel holds various international patents and has developed the tele-TASK teleteaching system, the online collaboration tool Tele-Board or HPI's popular ID leak checker service.

== Scientific organization and awards ==
From 1996 to 1999 he was a member of the Technology Advisory Board of Rhineland-Palatinate and from 2000 he was the founding chairman of the “Initiative of Software and Service Providers Rhineland-Palatinate”.

During his time at HPI, Meinel headed the Steering Committee of the HPI Future SOC Labs and was a member of the Security Advisory Board of SAP for many years.

Together with Hasso Plattner, he hosted the 1st National IT Summit (HPI, Potsdam, 2006) of the German Chancellor Angela Merkel. He has founded or chaired numerous other conferences or synpmpsia, e. g. the annual Potsdam Conferences for National Cyber Security of 2013, Industry 4. 0 conferences or the German IPvA Summits.

Together with Larry Leifer from Stanford University, he led the HPI-Stanford Design Thinking Research Program (HPDTRP), which he initiated between 2008 and 2022.

In 2017, Christoph Meinel was appointed Fellow by the Gesellschaft für Informatik (GI), which recognizes individuals who have made outstanding contributions to the GI and computer science. In 2019, Christoph Meinel was inducted into the New Internet IPv6 Hall of Fame. This honored his decades-long commitment as founder and chairman of the German IPv6 Council in the development and dissemination of the new IPv6 Internet Protocol standard.

Meinel has been honorary chairman of the national initiative MINT Zukunft schaffen since May 2022. He is a member of the board of the national excellence network MINT-EC.

== Publishing and editorial work ==
Google Scholar knows (as of April 2025) 1629 papers with Meinel as author or co-author, his H-Index is 72. A total of 28,712 citations were recorded there for these papers. Researchgate lists 1572 publications and records 19,654 citations and 375,212 read accesses. A complete structured publication list can be found on his website. Meinel is author, co-author, or editor of 25 textbooks.

Meinel is editor of the book series Understanding Innovation published by Springer-Verlag, the scientific online journals ECCC and ECDTR, the Internet-Bridge Germany-China. In 1994, he was the initiator and co-founder of the online journal on complexity theory ECCC – Electronic Colloquium on Computational Complexity and its editor-in-chief until 2016.

=== Selected Books in English Language ===
- Christoph Meinel, Maxim Asjoma:: Understanding the Digital Revolution A Beginner's Guide to the Internet and the Web. Springer 2025. ISBN 978-3-662-70132-4.
- Christoph Meinel, Timm Krohn (Eds..): Design Thinking in Education - Innovation Can Be Learned. Springer Cham 2022 ISBN 978-3-030-89112-1
- Anne Kayem, Stephen Wolthusen, Christoph Meinel (Hrsg.): Smart Micro-Grid Systems Security and Privacy ( Advances in Information Security, Vol. 71), Springer 2018, ISBN 978-3-319-91426-8.
- Christoph Meinel, Justus Broß, Philipp Berger, Patrick Hennig: Blogosphere and its Exploration. Springer, Berlin/Heidelberg 2015, ISBN 978-3-662-44409-2.
- Anne Kayem, Christoph Meinel: Information Security in Diverse Computing Environments, IGI Global Books, Hershey 2014, ISBN 978-1-4666-6158-5.
- Serge Linckels, Christoph Meinel: E-Librarian Service. User Friendly Semantic Search in Digital Libraries, Springer, Heidelberg 2011, ISBN 978-3-642-17742-2.
- Christoph Meinel: Modified Branching Programs and Their Computational Power (= Reihe Lecture Notes in Computer Science), Springer, Berlin/Heidelberg/New York 1989, ISBN 978-3-540-51340-7

== MOOCs and Teleteaching ==
Many lectures and lecture series of Christoph Meinel are recorded and freely accessible on the Internet via the tele-TASK portal. In 2012 his team designed the first European MOOC platform openHPI which provides many free online courses in the field of IT-technologies. He also offers various massive open online courses, for example on Blockchains, Internet Security for Beginners, Internet and Web Technologies with about 10.000 enrolled learners each. As a chairman of various Cloud-Learning initiatives Christoph Meinel leads innovations in the field of the digital transformation of the German schools and education sector. With projects such as "Bildungscloud" and "Schul-Cloud" he promote the use of digital media in schools and other educational instances.
