= Stanford Center for Design Research =

Design research center of Stanford University

Coordinates: 37.42583°N 122.17176°W

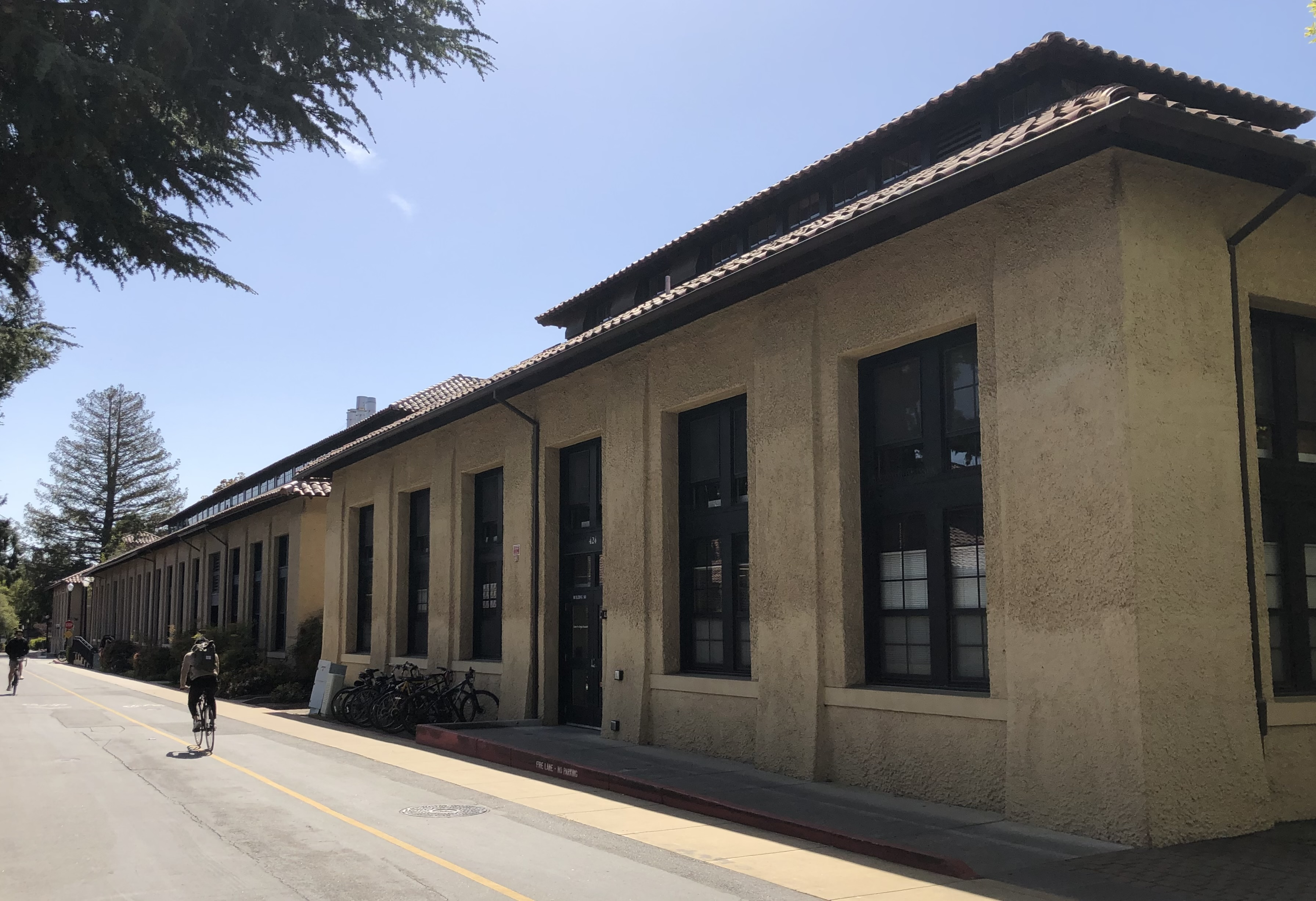
Center for Design Research Stanford

The Center for Design Research (CDR) was formed as the first research center at Stanford University to study the thinking, practices, team interactions, and environments of designers. The Center for Design Research was founded in 1984 by a collection of faculty from Stanford's Design Division, with money from companies including Apple Computer, DARPA, Hewlett-Packard, Sun Microsystems, NASA, and Toshiba Corporation. In the words of CDR founder Professor(Emeritus) Larry Leifer, "Since its inception in 1984, the work of the center has been guided by one stimulus question and two corollary response questions. What do designers do when they do design? How can we help them manage the process? How can information and communication technology support the process?"

Today, CDR acts as a nexus for graduate students and researchers in a number of affiliated research labs, including those headed by Professors Mark Cutkosky, Sheri Sheppard, Monroe Kennedy, Sean Folmer and Allison Okamura. Emeritus Professor Larry Leifer previously led labs in the center; Leifer was the founding Director of CDR.

The CDR is located in Building 560 at 424 Panama Mall, at the center of the "Design Quad".

== Notable Research ==
- Hasso Plattner Design Thinking Research Program (HPDTRP). SAP co-founder and early design thinking proponent Hasso Plattner sponsored a decade long, "rigorous academic methods to understand why and how Design Thinking innovation succeeds and fails." Research in the program led to multiple volumes of the Springer book series Understanding Innovation.

== Notable alumni ==
- Morgan Pope completed his doctorate in Prof. Mark Cutkosky's BDML Lab -- Biomimetics and Dexterous Manipulation Laboratory—in 2016 based on the SCAMP robot. His work as a Disney Imagineer resulted in the "Spider-Man, a stunt-double animatronic, or stuntronic" and "a rollerblading cartoon character".
- Santhi Analytis completed her doctorate in Prof. Mark Cutkosky's BDML Lab -- Biomimetics and Dexterous Manipulation Laboratory—in 2014 based on her work inventing a needle manipulator for MRI-guided interventions. After graduation she became the co-founder and CTO of Moxxly, a team who reinvented the breast pump; Moxxly was acquired by world-leader Medela in 2017. In 2023 she joined the Designer Fund as a New Venture Fellow.
- Maria Yang is the Gail E. Kendall (1978) Professor of Mechanical Engineering at the Massachusetts Institute of Technology (MIT), Associate Dean of Engineering at MIT, faculty academic director of the MIT D-Lab, and associate director of the MIT Morningside Academy for Design. She completed her doctorate in 2000 with Prof. Mark Cutkosky as advisor.

== CDR 2009 Podcast Episodes ==
- Sebastian Thrun (August 24, 2009). "Towards Self-Driving Cars". Center for Design Research (Podcast). Center for Design Research.

== See also ==
- Stanford University
- Stanford Joint Program in Design
