= IDEO =

American design and consulting firm

- Type: Private
- Industry: Design firm
- Founded: 1991, with the merging of David Kelley Design (est 1978), Moggridge Associates (est 1969), ID Two (est 1979), and Matrix Product Design (est 1983).
- Founders: David Kelley; Bill Moggridge; Mike Nuttall
- Headquarters: San Francisco, California
- Key people: Mike Peng, CEO; Tim Brown, Chair
- Number of employees: 500+ (2023)
- Website: www.ideo.com

IDEO (/ˈaɪdioʊ/) is a design and consulting firm with offices in the U.S., England, and China. It was founded in Palo Alto, California, in 1991, with the merger of several established firms.

The company's 500 staff uses a design thinking approach to design products, services, environments, brands, and digital experiences. By the early 2000s, the company had expanded into management consulting and organizational design. Since 2016, IDEO has been a member of Kyu Collective, after they purchased a minority stake in the firm

== History ==
IDEO was formed in 1991 by a merger of David Kelley Design (founded by Stanford University professor David Kelley in 1978), London-based Moggridge Associates and San Francisco's ID Two (both founded by British-born Bill Moggridge, in 1969 and 1979, respectively), and Matrix Product Design (founded by Mike Nuttall in 1983). David Kelley Design was previously Hovey-Kelley Design, which was a partnership between David Kelley and Dean Hovey. Hovey-Kelley Design worked on the design for the computer mice for the Apple Lisa and the original Apple Macintosh.

While the company started with a focus on designing consumer products (e.g., toothbrush, personal assistant, computers), by 2001, IDEO began to widen its focus on consumer experiences and services, and expanded its service offerings to include management consulting and organizational design. In 2011, IDEO incubated IDEO.org, a registered 501(c)(3) nonprofit focused on doing work that centers people in poor and vulnerable communities.

=== Leadership ===
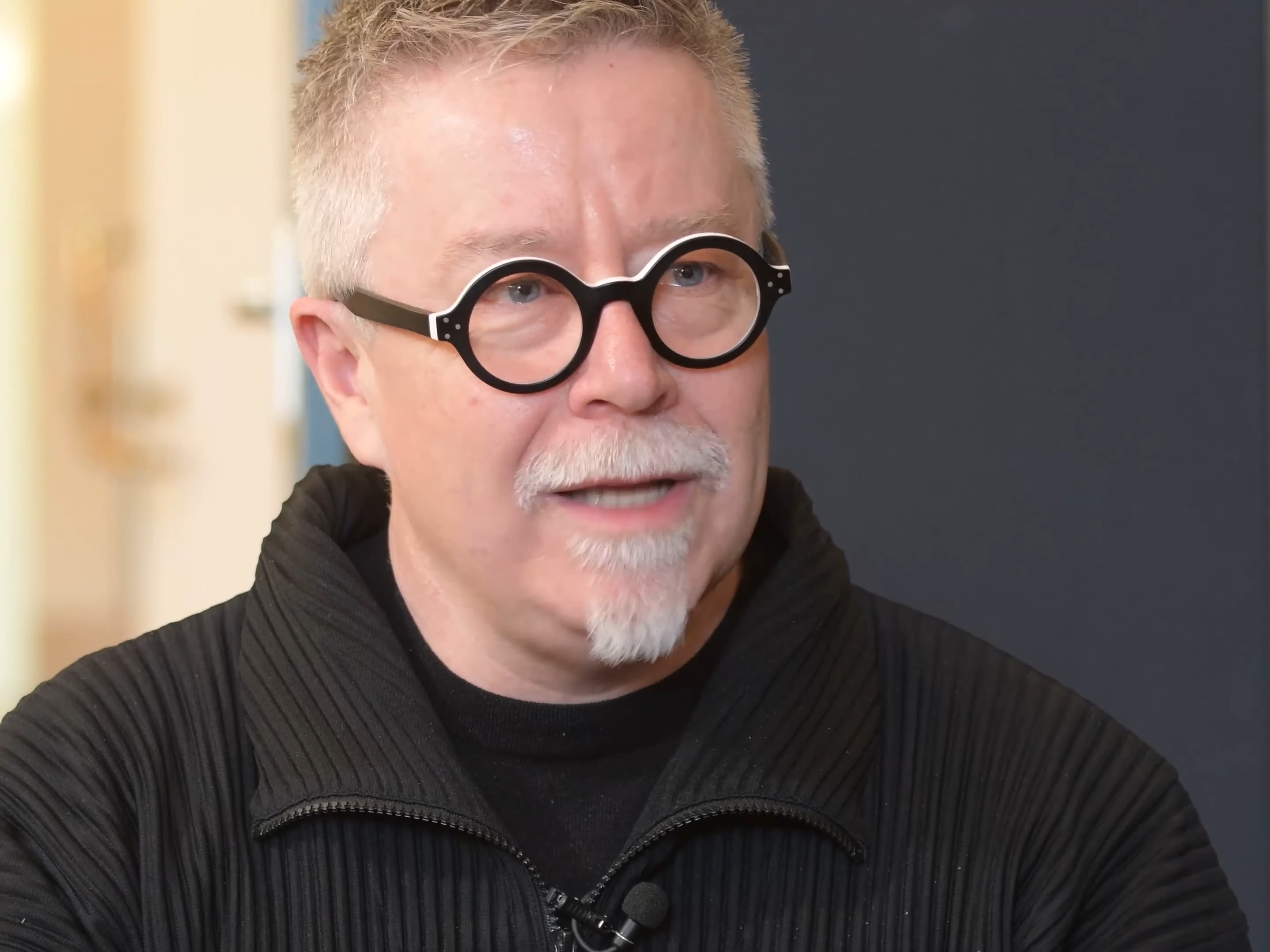
Tim Brown in 2018

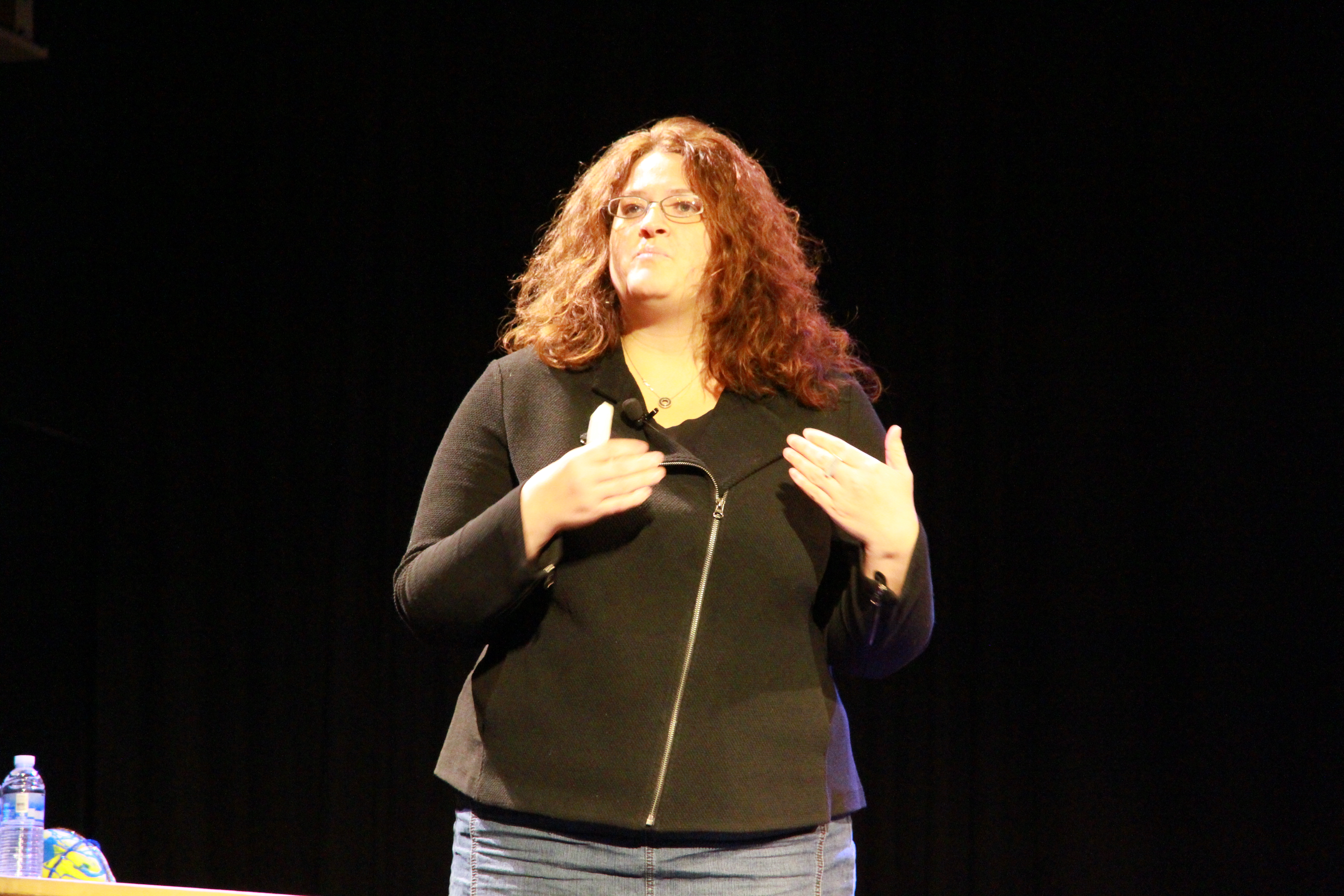
Sandy Speicher in 2011

In April 2019, the company announced that Sandy Speicher would replace Tim Brown as CEO of the company. In November 2022, the company announced that Derek Robson would become CEO effective January 5, 2023. In April 2025, the company announced that Mike Peng would become CEO effective June 2025.

=== The Deep Dive ===
On February 9, 1999, the ABC show Nightline featured IDEO in a segment called The Deep Dive: One Company's Secret Weapon for Innovation. The segment featured Jack Smith of ABC touring the IDEO office and challenging the company to redesign the shopping cart in five days to demonstrate IDEO's process for innovation. The result was a shopping cart with a nestable steel frame which holds removable plastic baskets to help deter theft and increase shopper flexibility. A dual child seat with a swing-up tray was also included in the design, as well as a cup holder, a barcode reader to skip the checkout line and steerable back wheels for manoeuvrability. The demonstration of IDEO's innovation process has led to the segment becoming part of numerous curricula, including Project Lead the Way and multiple universities.

=== Ownership ===
In 1996, Office-furniture maker Steelcase took a majority ownership stake in IDEO, which continued to operate independently. Steelcase began divesting its shares through a five-year management buy-back program in 2007.

In 2016, Japanese holding company Kyu Collective - a strategic operating unit of Japanese advertising and communications holding company Hakuhodo DY Holdings - purchased a minority stake in the firm, and Steelcase no longer holds an owership stake. With IDEO's acquisition by Kyu, the firm increasingly partners with other member firms of the collective.

=== Acquisitions and partnerships ===
On October 17, 2017, IDEO acquired Datascope, a data science firm based in Chicago. Datascope has worked with IDEO as a consultant on many projects over the past four years. Tim Brown, Chair of IDEO, states that the acquisition is largely motivated by advances in data sciences and machine learning. Datascope's 15-person team merged with IDEO's Chicago office.

== Organizational culture ==
IDEO's organizational culture consists of project teams, flat hierarchy, individual autonomy, creativity, and collaboration. The firm currently employs over 500 people across many disciplines, including: Behavioral Science, Branding, Business Design, Communication Design, Design Research, Digital Design, Education, Electrical Engineering, Environments Design, Food Science, Healthcare Services, Industrial Design, Interaction Design, Mechanical Engineering, Organizational Design, and Software Engineering.

== Products and services ==
IDEO has worked on projects in the consumer food and beverage, retail, computer, medical, educational, furniture, office, and automotive industries. Some examples include Apple's first mouse, the Palm V PDA, and Steelcase's Leap chair. Clients include Air New Zealand, Coca-Cola, ConAgra Foods, Eli Lilly, Ford, Medtronic, Mexichem, Sealy, ShinHo, and Steelcase among many others.

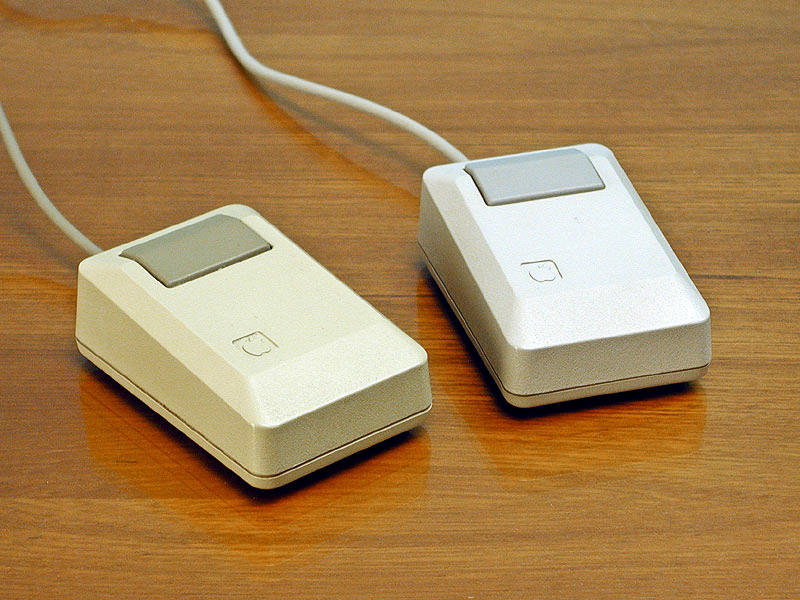
Early Apple computer mice

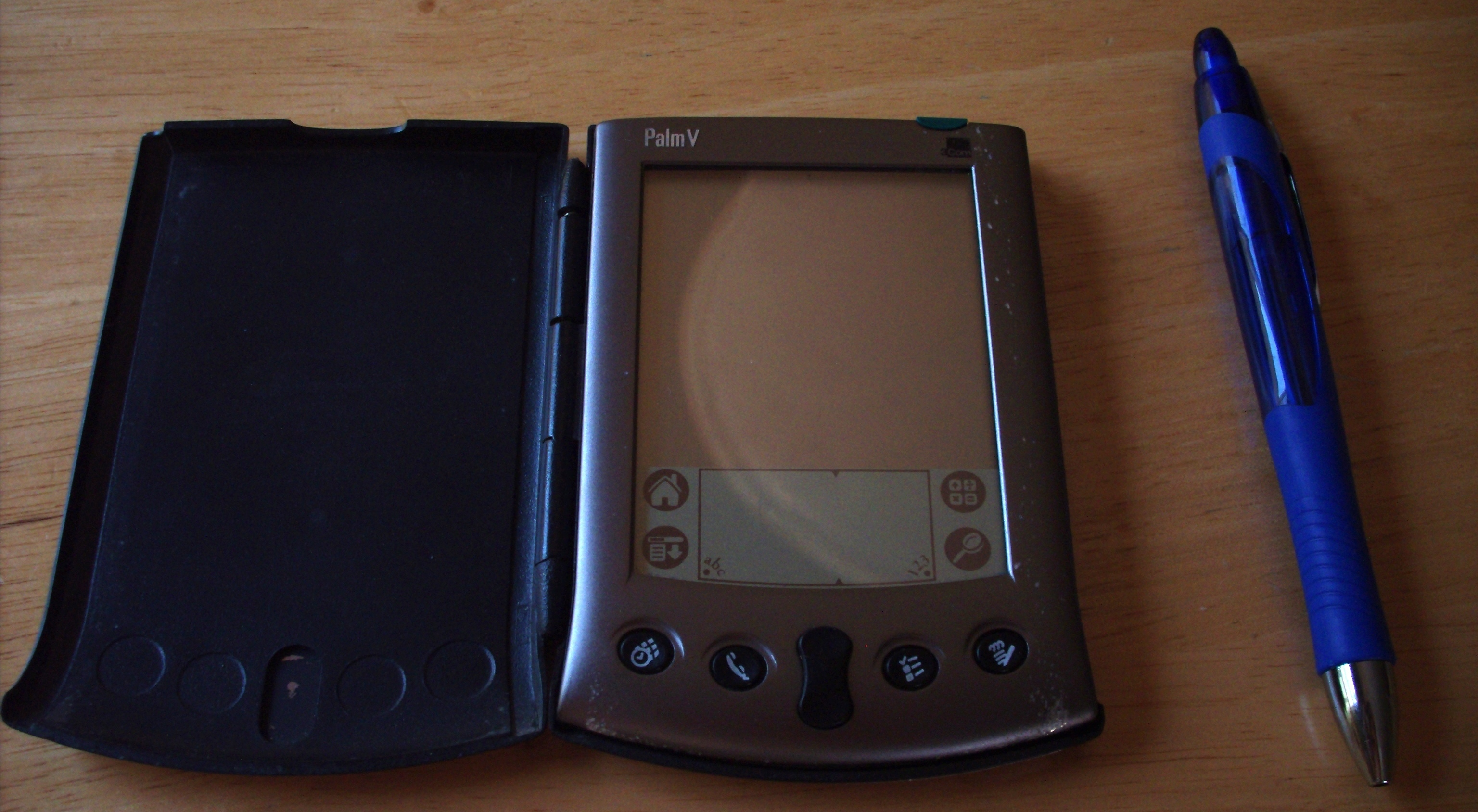
Palm V

=== OpenIDEO ===
In August 2010, IDEO introduced OpenIDEO, a collaborative platform for the design process. OpenIDEO was designed to be an internal tool for IDEO to collaborate with clients, but it is now a public tool. The purpose of the tool is to virtually drive the creative process to solve social problems, allowing for people of different expertise and backgrounds to collaborate. Examples of projects that have been facilitated by OpenIDEO include various projects of the WWF and TEDPrize winner Jamie Oliver's Food Revolution movement. In a collaboration with Sutter Health, London's Helix Centre and Shoshana R. Ungerleider, they completed an OpenIDEO Challenge to "reimagine the end of life experience" which later led to the founding of international initiatives, End Well and Re:imagine.

=== Design education ===
IDEO U is an online educational program released in early 2015. Course participants are instructed on the concepts surrounding human-centered design thinking.

In addition to the online program, IDEO and its affiliates have released multiple books on design thinking, including New York Times best-selling Creative Confidence: Unleashing the Creative Potential Within Us All. Former CEO Tim Brown is the author of Change by Design: How Design Thinking Transforms Organizations and Inspires Innovation (2009) in which he argues that design can transform problems into opportunities – emphasizing design thinking as a human-centered activity, he specifically prizes the feeling of empathy, where designers are capable of understanding the perspectives and problems the end users face.
