= Shinho =

Food manufacturer based in China

Shinho (Chinese: 欣和; pinyin: xinhe) is a food manufacturer in China. Its products include soy sauce, rice vinegar, and a range of classic Chinese condiments, in addition to peanut-based packaged snacks.

The company was founded in 1992.

== Soy sauce ==
Shinho launched China's first organic soy sauce in 2004. Shinho developed a method to ferment soy sauce using 44% less salt than with traditional methods. In its marketing, the low-salt soy sauce is advertised to have the same amount of umami as normal soy sauces.

== Huang Fei Hong Peanuts ==
Shinho also sells spiced peanuts under the Huang Fei Hong brand. In early 2023 Taiwan banned their import citing regulations restricting the importation of foodstuffs that are also produced locally.

== Awards ==
In 2013, its Huang Fei Hung spicy peanuts were featured in Saveur magazine's top 100 global food items.

Shinho has won a Guinness World Record for making the largest display of sandwich wraps on May 30, 2014. The sandwich wraps consisted of fermented soy bean paste and spring onion wrapped in traditional Chinese jianbing.
