= John E. Arnold =

American academic

John E. Arnold circa 1955, showing prop used in Arcturus IV case study for Creative Engineering course

John Edward Arnold (né Paulsen; March 14, 1913 – September 28, 1963) was an American professor of mechanical engineering and professor of business administration at Stanford University. He was a pioneer in scientifically defining and advancing inventiveness, based on the psychology of creative thinking and imagination, and an internationally recognized innovator in educational philosophy.

== Biography ==
John Arnold was born in Minneapolis, Minnesota. He received the B.A. in psychology in 1934 from the University of Minnesota and a M.S. in mechanical engineering in 1940 from Massachusetts Institute of Technology. Subsequently, he served in industry as a mechanical designer and research engineer. He taught at MIT from 1942 to 1957 and was the founder, director, and sole member of MIT's "Creative Engineering Laboratory".

In the 1950s Arnold sought to shift the meaning of design from being "the language used to tell fabrication and assembly where to make their cuts" to "the language of innovation", by which engineers expressed their imagination. He moved to Stanford University in 1957 with a joint appointment as professor of mechanical engineering and professor of business administration. He was founding director of the Design Division of the Mechanical Engineering Department, continuing to formulate and teach about creativity in engineering. He died at the age of 50 of a heart attack while traveling in Italy on sabbatical; he had planned to write a book on the philosophy of engineering.

Arnold taught summer seminars in creativity for manufacturing engineers, military researchers, and industrial designers (1953–1956 at MIT and continuing at Stanford). The 1956 summer program was particularly influential, including a presentation by R. Buckminster Fuller on the "comprehensive designer", J. P. Guilford's concept of measuring and developing creativity, and A. H. Maslow's "Emotional Blocks to Creativity", with considerable attention given to Alex Faickney Osborn's notion of "brainstorming".

Arnold consulted for government agencies and large American companies, including General Electric, Ford, Alcoa Aluminum, Corning Glass, RCA, and Bell Laboratories, advising how to manage "creative personnel" for new project development and increased R&D productivity. He was a major consultant for the General Motors Corporation's AC Spark Plug Division creativity program, one of the first industrial organizations to promote creative thinking.

On his passing, Arnold's Stanford colleagues described him as "an uncommon man ... a visionary thinker who set trends in design education". They said he was "warmly human, an outstanding and articulate speaker ... sought by many groups to contribute to their programs".

Stanford's Design Group, hosted by the Department of Mechanical Engineering, continues to develop Arnold's design methodology, combining creativity and technology with a "concern for human values and the needs of society".

== Early career and interests ==
John Arnold's activities demonstrated his vision of what it means to work and live as a creative person.

After graduating from college in 1934 and unable to find a job as a psychologist, he worked as a night watchman in an oil plant. Reading the technical reports laying about, he became interested in engineering. This motivated him to become part owner of a garage, where he gained practical knowledge and confidence to get a job as an assistant designer for a company making industrial machinery. That experience convinced him that he needed to learn the mechanical principles that made devices work, leading to acquiring an MIT engineering master's degree, which he completed in three years.

Subsequently, on joining the MIT faculty Arnold first taught courses in engineering mechanics, but his interests in teaching shifted to the process of engineering design. He became known internationally as an innovator in educational philosophy. Bringing his understanding of psychology into the design process, his notion of "creative engineering" showed engineering designers how to approach and solve problems creatively.

Appointed in 1955 as MIT's first educational television coordinator, he directed the program for two years, involving more than a hundred broadcasts. He was also President of the MIT Faculty Club and participated in the MIT Science Fiction Society.

While at MIT, Arnold designed and built a substantial portion of his home in Wenham, Massachusetts. Besides cultivating his fields and raising sheep, he was an amateur printer and photographer. He built miniature railroads, played tennis and the violin, and was chairman of the town school board.

Arnold's interest in architecture is reflected in his friendship with William Wurster. Arnold worked directly with Wurster's partner Theodore Bernardi in designing his California home near Stanford. He included a large basement shop with a dark room and printing press, which he used to produce handouts for his classes.

== Perspective on creativity ==
Arnold was well known for applying and devising heuristics for studying a problem and generating novel engineering solutions. By the late 1950s, a literature search on the subject of creativity would lead to his contributions. Basing design processes and teaching about design on psychology and contextual factors, Arnold demonstrated how the scientific method could be applied for improving creativity.

Arnold sought to balance the then prevalent analytical approach to technology with an approach based on synthesis, namely combining different perspectives for understanding and solving a problem. As a generalist, he advocated a broad perspective, envisioning the creative process as essential in life. He stated that challenges of "the modern age" called for engineers to be bold, devising entirely new kinds of solutions.

Arnold broke with the prevalent approach of giving engineering students highly specified problems that by definition have only one correct answer. In practical life, design begins with investigating a situation and learning about the environment to define what people need. Arnold said that the creative process "is an intellectual process ... whereby you combine and re-combine all your past experience or selected aspects of it ... [and] end up with a new combination, a new pattern, a new configuration that somehow satisfies some basic expressed or implied need of a man."

Arnold stated that the creative process is a particular kind of problem-solving, distinguished from decision-making by four requirements that make the result creative:

1. a better combination, not just something different
2. tangible, something you can see, or feel or react to in some fashion, not just an idea
3. forward-looking in time, relating to society's needs, not merely "recreative"
4. a "synergetic" quality—the value achieved in the combination is much greater than the sum of the parts (a multiplicative effect).

The value of a creative result was measured by increased function, improved performance, and lowered cost. The most important aspect of the creative process was figuring out what people need and thus would want to buy.

Arnold believed we can improve creativity by scientific understanding of the inventive process and improving it so it became more organized and deliberate with a step-by-step approach. He defined a framework for the creative process involving a combination of analysis, synthesis, and evaluation in three phases:

1. Question and observe (preparation),
2. Associate (production), and
3. Predict (decision-making).

Arnold viewed these phases as a kind of checklist for guiding creative work. In accord with his notion of being systematic, Arnold believed a machine could be developed that might assist an engineer in generating ideas by enumerating all possible cross-combinations and associations of different aspects or perspectives for describing and solving a problem. To prompt his own thinking, Arnold would refer to a deck of cards with probes adopted from Osborn, e.g., what could be rearranged, reversed, or put to other uses?

== Importance of individual thought in the creative process ==
During the Creativity Conference of 1958, participants debated the role of the individual versus the group in the creative process. Arnold's philosophy of creativity and design emphasized the individual because "Every new combination of values ... is formed in the mind of an individual man." While acknowledging that some engineering activities are best undertaken as a group activity to get feedback for ideas, he was critical of research directors who brought engineers together without concern for their individual competence. Accordingly, he advocated personal development first and foremost, providing guidelines for self-reflection and idea generation, a form of metacognition.

According to Arnold, some people believed that individuals could not invent because society and the sciences had become too complex—"no man can know all and therefore no man can invent." Consequently, these people overemphasize teamwork. Arnold said such efforts will fail because "the creative process is an individual process and, as John Steinbeck said, 'it lies in the lonely mind of a man.'"

Arnold's stressed that society needed engineers who could form and justify their own thoughts. He was concerned that teams sometimes inhibited or obstructed creativity: "What comes out of a team or a committee is the most daring idea that the least daring man can accept." In the ensuing debate, Smith agreed that this was a universal business problem. Irving A. Taylor, social psychologist, asserted that in the associative, "productive" phase, contributions by individuals in a group brainstorming session could be synergetic. But he generally agreed that the greatest creative accomplishments (such as a Picasso painting) were inherently individual endeavors.

M. F. Agha, a consultant art director and designer, argued that while it is true a group of individuals may produce nothing, working in groups was how business was done, and such practices were inherent in the "economic and cultural fabric" of society. He illustrated the social dynamics by a story of "Kibbitzers" who collaborated to develop an advertisement for a new product. At the same time, he admitted progress could be impaired by self-proclaimed experts, whom he called "Tsitzers" because their only effect was to squelch ideas, saying "Tsk, Tsk".

Despite his philosophical stand on the importance of the individual, Arnold's projects included some full-group sessions and small groups working together. Furthermore, his case material emphasized that specialists of different disciplines, including psychologists, engineers, economists, and politicians—although not working together in the same room—did exchange questions and information necessary for defining and solving problems. Arnold illustrated this collaborative aspect of the creative process in great detail in the Arcturus IV Case Study.

== The Arcturus IV case study in creative engineering ==
Arnold's philosophy of design was first formulated and taught in "Creative Engineering" courses at MIT in the 1951–52 school year. He developed a case study called Arcturus IV that gained considerable attention in the public press, but its humanistic perspective was new and controversial. The New York Times obituary stated that Arnold's "highly imaginative classroom methods to stimulate creative thinking ... caused a stir among traditional educators and conservative engineering leaders."

The Arcturus IV Case Study posited a fictitious planet around the star Arcturus with beings, called Methanians, for whom the students were to design marketable products. This ground-breaking use of science fiction in engineering education was based on Arnold's ideas that, first, thinking creatively could be taught and improved by practice, and second, designing for an unfamiliar, imaginary world would jolt engineers to change how they approached problems. Thus he viewed imagining as a kind of skill that could be exercised.

The Arcturus setting required the mechanical engineering students to set aside personal experience and assumptions to understand and design for the needs of beings very different from themselves—"the inhabitants were a bird-like race that breathed methane, had three eyes (one X-ray) three fingers and very low sales resistance". The students' task was to design tools and appliances for these beings. In particular, Arnold said that he sought to unsettle "preconceived notions about man-machine relationships and to strengthen the influence of environment on design".

Translated back to Earthlings, Arnold was promoting a humanistic approach sensitive to the physical setting and cultural practices—an early form of user-centered design. His approach was motivated by his belief that the increasing complexity and number of the nation's and world's problems required more attention to what society needed, requiring a new way of analyzing situations. This challenge and responsibility extended beyond product design courses to other disciplines.

Arnold's MIT Product Design course was conducted as an informal seminar combining discussions, demonstrations, and laboratory work. These conveyed the nature of the creative process; tools used by creative engineers; and factors that should be considered. Together the exercise would demonstrate the effect of practice on improved imagination and confidence in solving challenging problems.

Each student received a copy of the Arcturus IV 117 page case file, which proposed that the student was living a 1000 years in the future when traveling to distant planets in other star systems was routine, enabling trade with other beings. The file contained copies of correspondence of various fictitious agencies and people, presented "on specially prepared stationery and report forms, stamped and handled in the best businesslike manner" to create a realistic context. Students were employees of a design and manufacturing company, the Massachusetts Intergalactic Traders (MIT), which sought to design consumer goods for the Methanians. The initial problem was to devise which needs to satisfy.

A special governmental bureau, the Terran Exporting Counsel Headquarters (TECH), had gathered information for use in trading with other planets. It covered biology, physiology, and culture of the Methanians in the context of the planet's characteristics. The students became involved in science fiction invention itself, as they had to provide new, but consistent information that might be required to design products implied by the psychology and daily needs of the Methanians. For example, students designed furniture and vehicles suitable for the Methanians' elongated physiology. Making the point of his pedagogical approach, Arnold asked, "Do you think that the average, present day Terranian designer gives as much thought to human limitations?"

A quarter (3 weeks) of the Creative Engineering course was devoted to the Arcturus project. Arnold observed that "time spent out in space" profoundly influenced the students in subsequent course exercises, such that students would become engaged in a broad and detailed consideration of relevant design factors. The science fiction exercise "jolted" the student, requiring an adjustment to thinking and methods that made subsequent learning easier: "He has to stretch his imagination to such a limit that it doesn't quickly shrink back to its former inconspicuous self."

Accused by some academic colleagues of "theatricalism and publicity-seeking", Arnold believed it was important for designers to develop daring and confidence against what he called "a vicious jury" that might destroy ideas. Arnold believed that the Arcturus IV case, because it raised issues about the planet and inhabitants that couldn't be resolved, would instill confidence in a student who proceeded deliberately and logically in designs based on principles. This experience would then help the student retain his self-confidence when a design jury found a mistake in his work. He wrote, "In the Arcturus case the student designer can always rationalize that he is as much entitled to his opinion as the jury is to theirs and everyone lives happily ever after."

Finally, Arnold observed that many of the engineers enjoyed science-fiction, so this first case study was fun. He said that the Creative Engineering Group at M.I.T. did not support the idea that "education must be solemn and serious". The Arcturus case served as an "ice-breaker" that made the students into friends.

Following his philosophy of promoting creativity in all of life's endeavors, Arnold encouraged students to help formulate the course (including members of the MIT Science Fiction Society), such that the design of the course itself became a case for the Creative Engineering Group to reflect upon.

== Courses taught at Stanford ==
In his first two school years at Stanford University (1957–59), Arnold introduced and taught Mechanical Engineering Design, subsequently taught by others. Following the formation of the Design Division by Arnold, related courses were added by Robert McKim, Rapid Visualization and Product Design.

During 1958–1963 Arnold taught graduate courses that viewed design more generally. Philosophy of Design emphasized the nature of the creative process and factors that influenced it. The course discussed the designer's "attitudes and viewpoints" and the "techniques of analysis, synthesis and evaluation". Human Factors in Design concerned "Man's strength and weaknesses in opposition to and/or in cooperation with machines", including "the transfer of information, energy, and matter between man and machine". Comprehensive Design was a seminar about actual design practice; it stressed "imagination tempered with sound engineering analysis and judgment".

Starting in 1960, Arnold added a senior colloquium to his courses; it was intended particularly for students not in the Mechanical Engineering Department. This course, How to Ask a Question, was based on the claim that "Each of man's advances was started by a question. ... Knowing what questions to ask and how to ask them is sometimes more important than the eventual answers."

Starting in 1962, Arnold also taught Engineering Drawing, the "study and application of the language of vision as it applies to the engineer and scientist", as part of the general Engineering School curriculum. Because of his sabbatical in 1963, it was the only course he was scheduled to teach in 1963–64. Following Arnold's philosophy, in this year McKim started to offer a Design Project course that emphasized "the cross-discipline responsibilities of the designer"; follow-on semesters emphasized "economic and marketing determinants" and experimentation, leading to a working prototype.

== Notable acknowledgements ==
James Adams in Conceptual Blockbusting: "I was first introduced to thinking about thinking by the late John E. Arnold, a pioneer in education and one of my all-time personal heroes. Quite a bit of the book reflects his thinking."

Robert McKim in Experiences in Visual Thinking: "My greatest debt is to the late professor John E. Arnold, who not only suggested that I develop a visual-thinking course at Stanford (a course that has been a major testing ground for this book), but who also influenced me by his pioneering efforts to educate productive thinking."

Frederik Pohl in the science fiction novel Jem refers to an engineering design class at the "MISFITS" that created products for export to Arcturus.

== See also ==
- Stanford Joint Program in Design
