= OpenHPI (Online Education) =

Platform devoted to massive open online courses

openHPI
- Website type: Online education
- Available in: English, German
- Owner: Hasso Plattner Institute
- Website: openhpi.de
- Commercial: No
- Registration: Required
- Launched: September 2012; 14 years ago
- Current status: Active

openHPI is a platform for massive open online courses (MOOC) in the field of computer science and information technology. It is hosted at the Hasso Plattner Institute (HPI) in Potsdam, Germany. openHPI is open to everyone, and participation is free of charge. Everybody can register and enroll for courses without any prerequisites. openHPI's courses are derived from HPI's bachelor and master programs in IT-Systems Engineering and cover both, foundations of information technology as well as highly topical innovations.

The course languages are English and German. openHPI offers around six to ten courses per year. All courses follow the same educational format: The subject domain is split into two to six weekly units. Each week, video lectures, reading materials and quizzes are presented in a learning sequence. Learners can ask their questions and discuss points of interest with each other in the course discussion forum which is actively moderated by the teaching team. Learning progress is measured through self-tests which can be repeated as often as desired, and assessed in graded weekly assignments, and a graded final exam. Participants who achieve at least 50% of the total score receive a record of achievement. After a course ends, materials remain available in archive mode.

== History ==
The platform, which began in September 2012, pioneered the MOOC format in Germany. The first course covered the topic of In-Memory Data Management and was given by the founder of the HPI, Hasso Plattner. In 2017, five years after its launch, openHPI reached the benchmark of 400,000 enrollments. Among other things, the courses contain the following topics:

- In-Memory Data Management
- Internetworking with TCP/IP
- Internet Security for Beginners
- Web Technologies
- Embedded Smart Home
- Semantic Web Technologies
- Data Management with SQL
- Business Process Modeling and Analysis
- Objekt-oriented programming in Java
- Linux for everyone

== Technical aspects ==
The platform was originally based on the popular learning management system Canvas, with some technical adaptations for example a reworked front end. The experience with the first courses showed that this system was not able to scale to many thousands of participants. Therefore, a new platform was developed from scratch in the sense of a service-oriented architecture (SOA), which allows better scalability and more flexibility regarding the integration of features. Video streaming is made through the streaming provider Vimeo. The platform uses a dual stream video player which allows the synchronous playback of two video sources, for example the video of a lecturer together with the video of the presentation slides. In 2015, the programming platform CodeOcean was developed by HPI researchers and integrated in openHPI. CodeOcean is available as an open source solution and allows programming directly in the browser. It has already been used in the openHPI courses “Java für Einsteiger,” “Web Technologies,” and “Spielend Programmieren lernen”. Since 2017, the open mode has been available on openHPI, meaning that you can watch many of the videos without having to create an account. Only for specific actions, such as writing in the forum or taking an exam, you need to enroll.

== Partner platforms ==
Since 2013, SAP SE has used another instance of the same platform (openSAP) to make its training offers available to employees, customers, and a broad public. The Hasso Plattner Institute has run another instance of the same platform called mooc.house since 2015. The mooc.house platform is a white label solution for companies, institutions, and individuals who want to offer their own online courses. In 2017, the Hasso Plattner Institute set up another MOOC platform for the World Health Organization (WHO). On OpenWHO, the WHO offers online courses on topics that focus on improving the response to health emergencies.
