= Hasso Plattner Institute for Digital Engineering =

German information technology college

Coordinates: 52°23′37″N 13°07′56″E

Hasso Plattner Institute
- Hasso-Plattner-Institut für Digital Engineering gGmbH
- Motto: Design IT. Create Knowledge.
- Type: privately financed university institute
- Established: 1998
- Affiliations: University of Potsdam
- Director: Tobias Friedrich, Henrik Haenecke, Daniela Gerd tom Markotten
- Total staff: 389
- Students: 1,000
- Location: Potsdam, Germany
- Website: hpi.de

The Hasso Plattner Institute for Digital Engineering gGmbH (German: Hasso-Plattner-Institut für Digital Engineering gGmbH; HPI) is an academic institute based in Potsdam, Brandenburg, northeastern Germany, focusing primarily on information technology. Legally, it has the form of a non-profit limited liability company. It has a close partnership with the University of Potsdam, where it established and runs the Digital Engineering Faculty.

The teaching and research of HPI are focused on "IT-Systems Engineering". HPI was founded in 1998, and is the first, and as of 2018, the only entirely privately funded faculty in Germany. It is financed entirely through private funds donated by billionaire Hasso Plattner, who co-founded the software company SAP SE, and is currently the chairman of SAP's supervisory board. From 2004 to 2023 the institute was headed by Christoph Meinel. On April 1, 2023, a team consisting of Tobias Friedrich, Marcus Kölling and Ralf Herbrich took over the management of the institute. Since October 1, 2025, Tobias Friedrich and Henrik Haenecke have been leading the institute. On August 1, 2026, Daniela Gerd tom Markotten was appointed Managing Director Partnerships and Transfer.

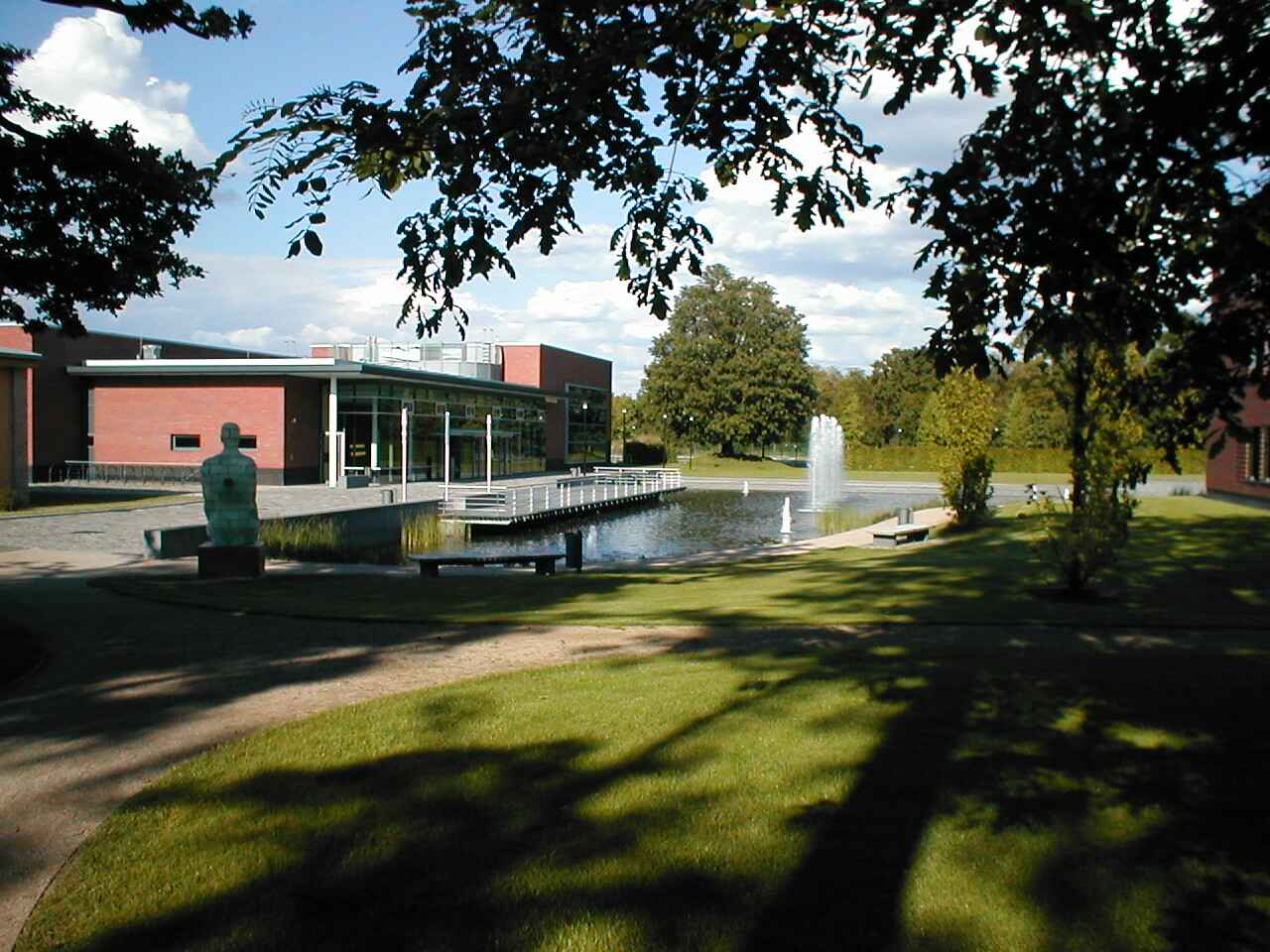
Lecture halls (old picture without main building in the background)

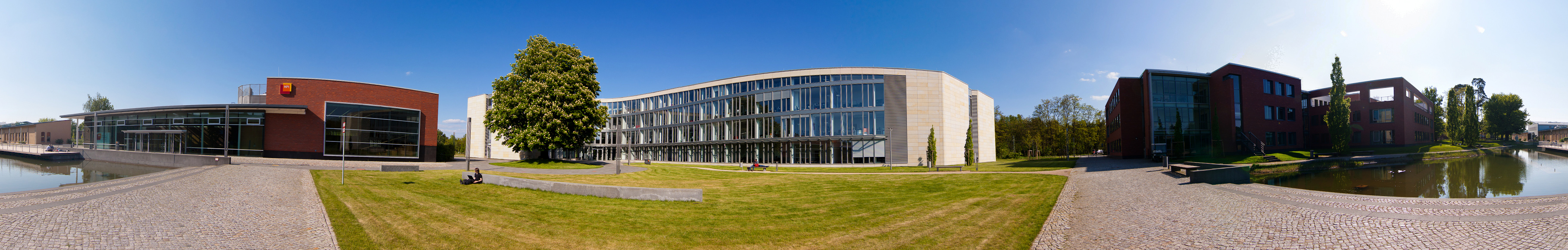
Campus panorama view

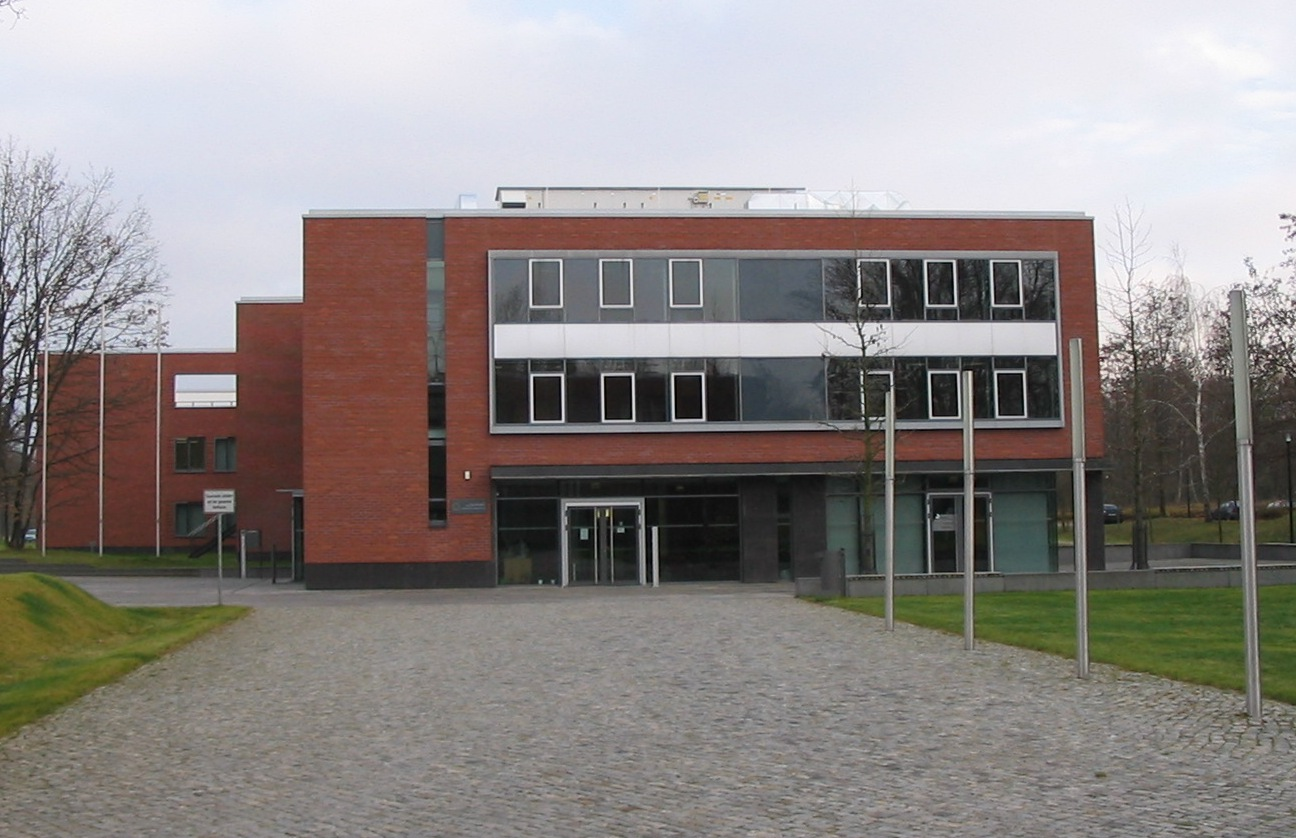
A-B-C building (former main building)

== History ==
The HPI was founded in October 1998 as a public–private partnership. The private partner is the Hasso Plattner Foundation, which is the administrative body responsible for the HPI and its only corporate member. The foundation's legal status is that of a GmbH, a limited-liability company according to German law. As the public part of the partnership, the State of Brandenburg provided the estate where several multi-storey buildings were built to form a nice campus. Hasso Plattner declared to provide at least 200 million Euros for the HPI within the first 20 years. He is also actively involved as a lecturer and head of the chair on Enterprise Platform and Integration Concepts, where the in-memory technology was developed. In 2004, he received his honorary professorship from the University of Potsdam.

Since 2007, the HPI maintains a particularly close cooperation with the Hasso Plattner Institute of Design, part of Stanford University's School of Engineering. In addition to the exchange of students and scientists, an annual workshop on Design Thinking is held in Germany. German companies are simultaneously involved in joint international development projects between Potsdam and Palo Alto aimed at simplifying the implementation of such projects on both sides of the Atlantic with the help of tele-teaching technology.

== openHPI ==
In 2012, based on HPI's tele-TASK research project, openHPI began operations. openHPI is an Internet educational platform for offering massive open online courses (MOOCs), which is embedded in a global social network. It offers interactive online courses about topics in information technology. Participants can become familiar with basic topics of computer science, and IT systems engineering along with current research topics in IT.

== Rankings and awards ==
The Center for Higher Education Development (CHE) is an independent private non-profit organization, founded by the German Rectors' Conference and the Bertelsmann Foundation. According to its university ranking in 2020, HPI's Bachelor's and Master's programs are among the four best-ranked computer science programs in the German-speaking countries with the Bachelor's program valued highest in 18 out of 28 analyzed categories and among the best in five additional categories.

In 2012, HPI and SAP received the German Innovation Prize (Deutscher Innovationspreis), a prize awarded by Accenture, EnBW, Evonik and Wirtschaftswoche, for the development of the in-memory database SAP HANA.

== Criticism ==
In 2024 HPI was heavily criticized for Union busting against the founding activities of a Works council. Posters for workers' assemblies has been removed and about €200,000 been paid to the law firm Pusch Wahlig Workplace Law specialized for anti-union measurements. As a result, the institute founded an alternative committee which has been criticized for being a "fake council" only existing to bypass the right to organize. The association "aktion ./. arbeitsunrecht", which campaigns against labor injustice and for more democracy in business and industry, considers the actions of the Hasso Plattner Institute to be criminal within the meaning of § 119 of the Works Constitution Act. The law firm Pusch Wahlig Workplace Law had also already attracted attention through union busting at Flink in Berlin as well as at the car rental company Sixt and the beverage supplier Flaschenpost. A spokesperson for the legal protection department of the German Trade Union Confederation judged the HPI's actions to be "clearly unlawful". The events were also discussed in the Brandenburg state parliament at the request of the Left Party. The Left Party, the SPD and the Greens took a clear stance in support of setting up a works council and against Union busting. The far right wing party AfD strongly questioned Correctiv's account and spoke out in favor of academic freedom. At the beginning of April 2024, HPI employees voted with a majority of 68% for the establishment of the Institute Council.

== Notable alumni ==
- Gero Decker, Founder of Unicorn startup Signavio
- Christian Holz, Associate Professor at ETH Zürich
- Alexandra Ion, Assistant Professor at Carnegie Mellon University (CMU)
- Stefanie Mueller, Associate Professor at MIT
