= Stanford Joint Program in Design =

Former design program at Stanford University

Stanford Design Program
- Stanford University
- Type: Academic program in design, specifically on the fine art and engineering of product design
- Available: 1958–2017
- Enrollment: 25 graduate students

The Joint Program in Design (also called the Graduate Design Program or simply the Design Program) was a graduate program jointly offered by the Department of Mechanical Engineering and the Department of Art & Art History at Stanford University. It was discontinued with the last cohort of students graduating in Spring 2017 and is succeeded by the Stanford Design Impact Engineering Master's Degree. The program offered degrees in Mechanical Engineering and in Fine Arts/Design and was closely connected with the Stanford d.school (The d.school is not one of the seven schools at Stanford and does not grant degrees).

The program was founded in 1958, and had three full-time faculty. It maintained close links with the design and technology firms of nearby Silicon Valley.

== History ==
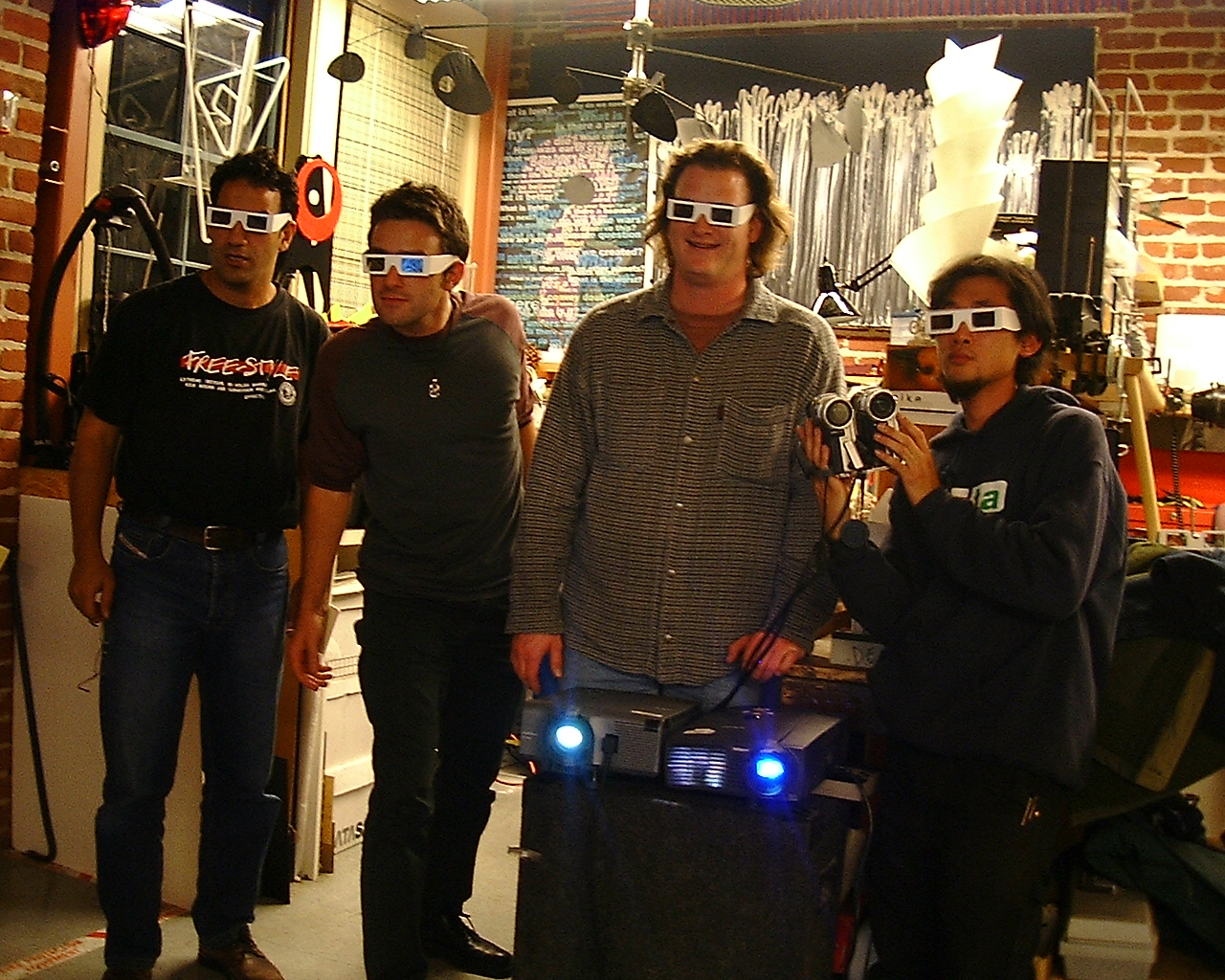
Students in Design Loft

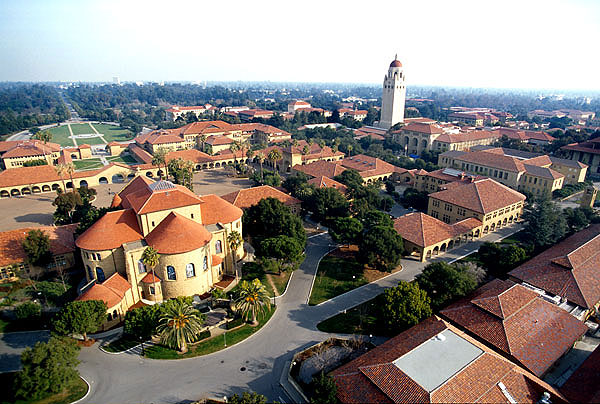
Aerial view of the Main Quad.

Stanford's Design program dates from 1958 when Professor John E. Arnold, formerly of the Massachusetts Institute of Technology, first proposed the idea that design engineering should be human-centered. This was a radical concept in the era of Sputnik and the early Cold War. Building on Arnold's work, Bob McKim (Emeritus, Engineering) along with Matt Kahn (Art), created the Product Design major and the graduate-level Joint Program in Design. This curriculum was formalized in the mid-1960s, making the Joint Program in Design (JPD) one of the first inter-departmental programs at Stanford or other nationally prominent Universities. The key texts in those days were McKim's recently published Experiences in Visual Thinking, and Jim Adams', Conceptual Blockbusting, a Guide to Better Ideas. The "loft" was a bootleg attic space in Building 500 that the University didn't know about (and the faculty pretended didn't exist). ME101: Visual Thinking was the introductory class for all product design students and the class included four "voyages" in the Imaginarium, a 16-foot geodesic dome that presented state-of-the art multimedia shows designed to stimulate creativity.

The Loft moved to its current location behind the Old Firehouse. Bob McKim went Emeritus; Matt Kahn, Rolf Faste and David Kelley continued instruction in the tradition of merging art, science and needfinding though the 1980s and 1990s. Today ME101 is still taught, although the Mechanical Engineering Department and the Department of Art no longer continue their historic collaboration with faculty drawn from both schools in its instruction.

== See also ==
- Stanford Hasso Plattner Institute of Design ("the d.school")
- Silicon Valley
- Leadership
- Entrepreneurship
- Globalization
- Social responsibility
