= Interaction Design Institute Ivrea =

Graduate design school in Ivrea, Italy (2001–2006)

- Type: Private
- Active: 2001–2006
- Founding Director: Gillian Crampton Smith
- Students: 56
- Location: Ivrea, Piedmont, Italy; 45.45820292694756°N 7.875056813430575°E
- Campus: Urban
- Website: interactionivrea.org/en/index.asp

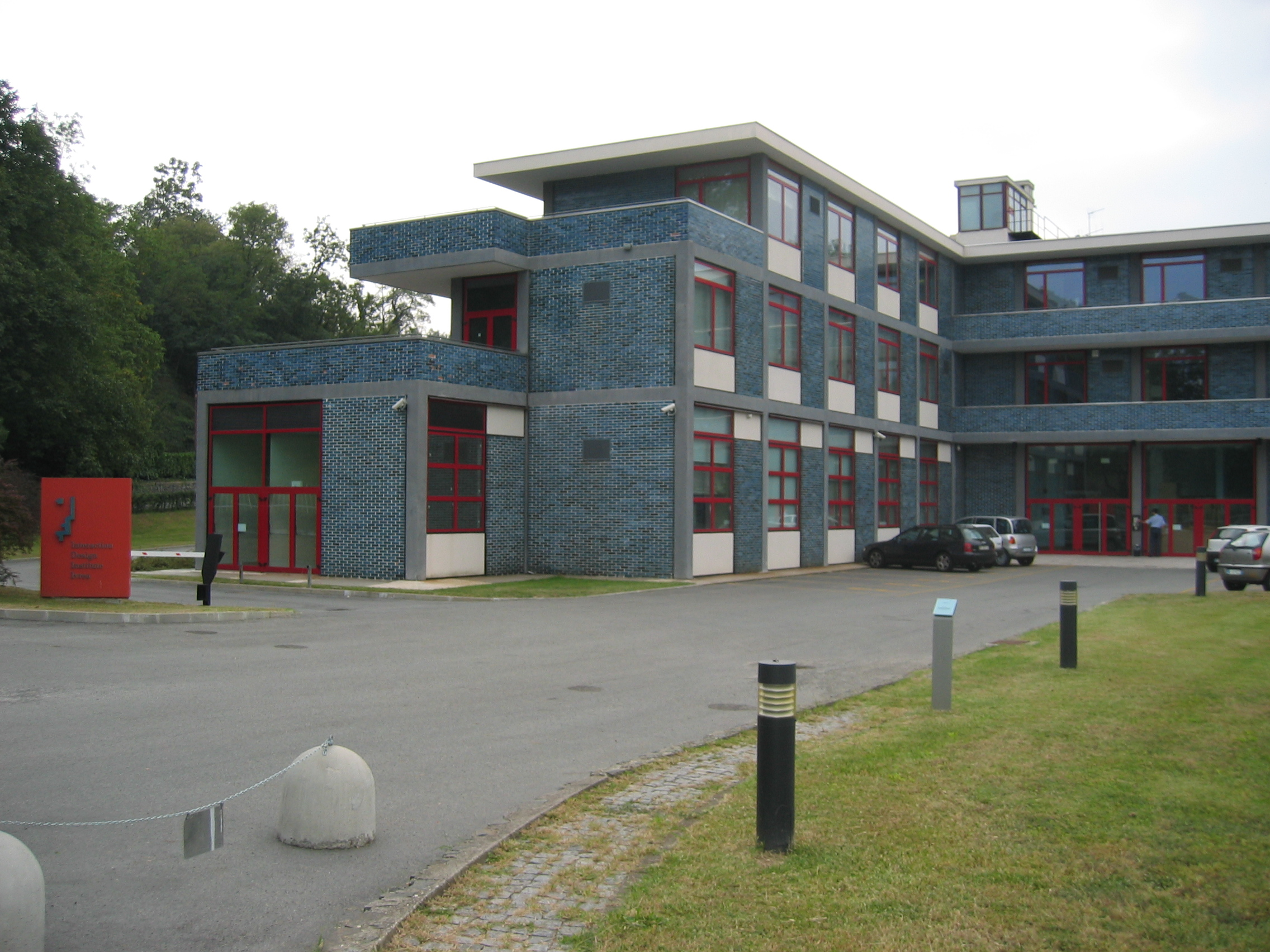
The former Olivetti Study and Research Centre, sometimes referred to as Casa Blu, which housed the Interaction Design Institute Ivrea between 2001 and 2005

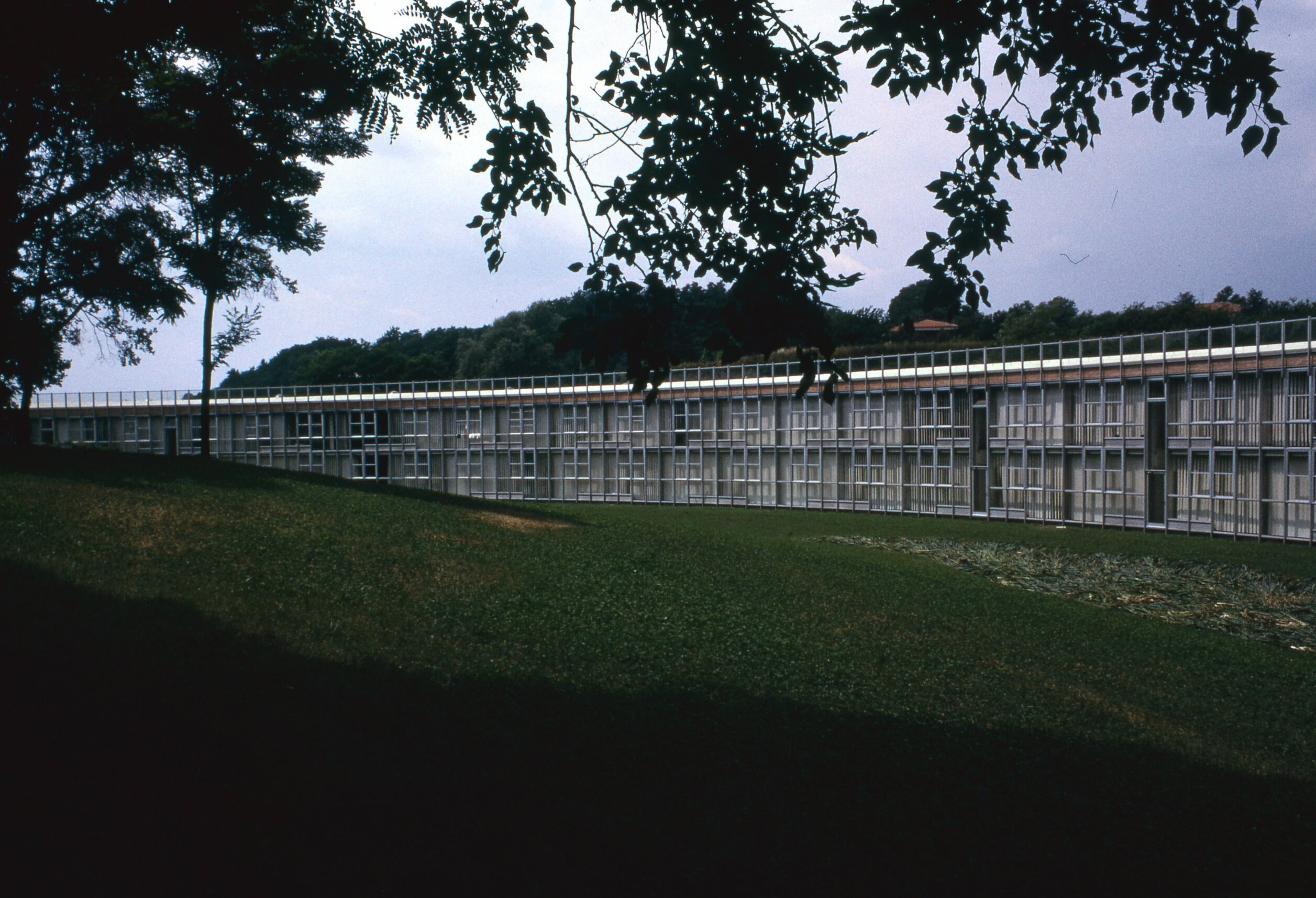
The Western Residential Unit ("Unità Residenziale Ovest" in Italian, colloquially referred to as Talponia) which served as student housing for the Interaction Design Institute Ivrea.

Interaction Design Institute Ivrea (also known as Interaction Ivrea or IDII) was a private educational institution offering a two-year graduate program in the field of Interaction Design, operating in the town of Ivrea in Northern Italy between 2001 and 2006.

The institute was based in the former Olivetti Study and Research Centre, sometimes referred to as Casa Blu, designed by Eduardo Vittorio in 1955 and restored by Sottsass Associati. Students lived in the complex's Western Residential Unit, colloquially known as Talponia.

== History ==
The Interaction Design Institute Ivrea Association was founded on 16 June 2000 by Telecom Italia and Olivetti, with its headquarters in Ivrea, with the first class of students arriving in 2001. The founding director of the school was Gillian Crampton Smith until 2005. The school's mission was described in Blueprint as:

"Ivrea will explore business in addition to design and technology. Crampton Smith believes that today there is an 'art' in imagining new business models, and is also aware that, partly because of their broad education, design graduates often move into strategic roles in companies and need to be equipped to learn for themselves."

Among the academic advisors of Interaction Ivrea were leading practitioners and theorists like John Maeda, Ranjit Makkuni, Joy Mountford, John Thackara, Bill Verplank, Nathan Shedroff, Bill Moggridge (co-founder of IDEO) and David Liddle (co-founder of Interval Research).

While the institute also did a measure of outside consulting work and hosted visiting researchers, its main activity was the Interaction Design Master course, a 2-year unaccredited course which graduated 56 students.

== Closure ==
The school operated between 2001 and 2006 after its initial 5-year endowment from Telecom Italia ended and was not renewed. Gillian Crampton-Smith resigned as Director a result of the announcement, and Neil Churcher and Heather Martin became co-directors during the final academic year when the institute was moved to Milan to be in the same building as Domus Academy, another Telecom Italia investment. The curriculum was subsequently merged with Domus's Interaction Design course and IDII's operation ceased in 2007. Its exhibition design unit (E1) was spun off to form an independent company, Interaction Design Lab, currently operating in Milan. The original program website was archived.

== Legacy ==
Despite its brief lifespan and limited overall number of students and researchers, the institute had an outsize impact on the field of interaction design.

The institute was the birthplace of products like the electronics prototyping boards Wiring and Arduino, the graphics software prototyping environment Processing (begun at the MIT Media Lab), the CICCIO inflatable environment, and the connected product Good Night Lamp, which is included in the permanent collection of the London Design Museum. Interaction Ivrea student work was exhibited at the Victoria and Albert museum in London and at Salone del Mobile in Milan. Publications include the Interaction Design Primer design manual. It was also part of the Convivio Network of Excellence European research project.

Alumni and ex-faculty have worked in places like Apple, Microsoft, Spotify, IDEO, IBM, and frog design, or continued to teach in institutions like NABA, Domus Academy, Università Iuav di Venezia, Hasso Plattner Institute of Design at Stanford University, the Delft University of Technology, the Centro Metropolitano de Diseño of the City of Buenos Aires, and the University of Applied Sciences Potsdam.

In 2007, former members of the Ivrea staff and leadership founded the Copenhagen Institute of Interaction Design, with a structure and curriculum based on that of IDII. The program is headed by Simona Maschi, who had been among the original faculty at Ivrea, and many of the early faculty at CIID were teachers or students at Ivrea, including Gillian Crampton Smith and Bill Verplank, who sit on the board. Originally based in Denmark and with a location in Costa Rica, since 2024 CIID has been headquartered in Bergamo, about 150km east of the town of Ivrea.
