= Oscilloscoop =

2011 iOS application

OscilloScoop
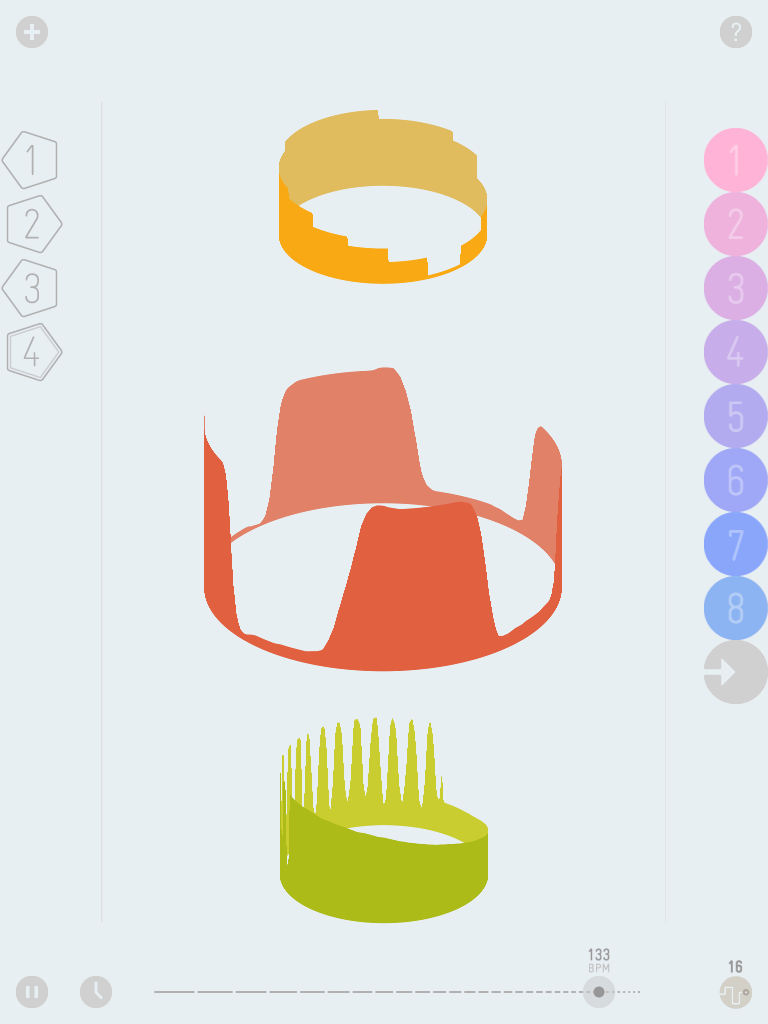
- Developer(s): Scott Snibbe, Lukas Girling, Graham McDermott
- Publisher(s): Scott Snibbe Studio
- Platform(s): iOS
- Release: May 3, 2011
- Genre(s): Music

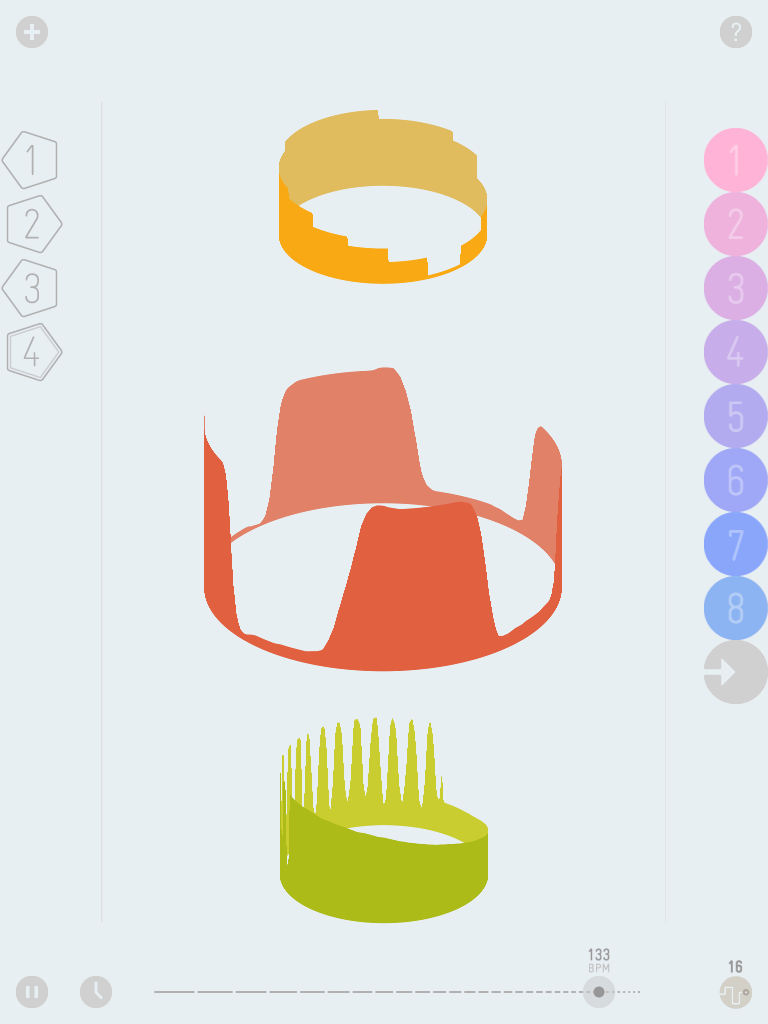
OscilloScoop for the iPad

OscilloScoop is an interactive music app for iOS that runs on the iPad, iPhone, and iPod Touch, available through the iTunes App Store. The app presents a real-time interface for creating electronic music in various electronic music genres from hip hop to techno and house. The app is designed with a minimalist modern interface of three colored crowns, that spin like potters' wheels. Touching each crown affects the parameters of the audio. The top crown controls pitch, the middle a low pass resonant filter, and the bottom a fader. Controls on the left allow one to change the bassline beat, while buttons on the right allow the user to save their creation, and a slider below controls tempo.

In 2011, OscilloScoop won the ZKM App Art Award, the first award ever given to art apps.

== History ==
OscilloScoop was designed by Lukas Girling, a creator of interactive musical interfaces who has worked with world-renowned musicians and music technologists including Laurie Anderson and Max Mathews. The app was created in collaboration with interactive artist and programmer Scott Snibbe, author of the bestselling apps Bubble Harp and Gravilux; and Graham McDermott, noted video game and app developer.

Girling and Snibbe began working together in 1996 at Interval Research researching new forms of musical instruments with Joy Mountford and Bob Adams. As part of the research groups there, they were able to collaborate with, and learn from highly regarded musicians and musical pioneers including Brian Eno, Laurie Anderson, and Max Mathews. Their work at Interval Research was never published, and they recently re-united to produce a new app for iOS that allows ordinary people to create electronic music with similar results as professionals.

Their work borrows from the language of DJs, using the body's movements to create music in real-time, rather than composing music slice-by-slice with complex music authoring tools like ProTools and Ableton Live, creating "something as effortless (and fun) as Super Mario," according to Snibbe.
