= Zeiss ZX1 =

Full-frame fixed-lens digital camera produced by Carl Zeiss AG, released 2020

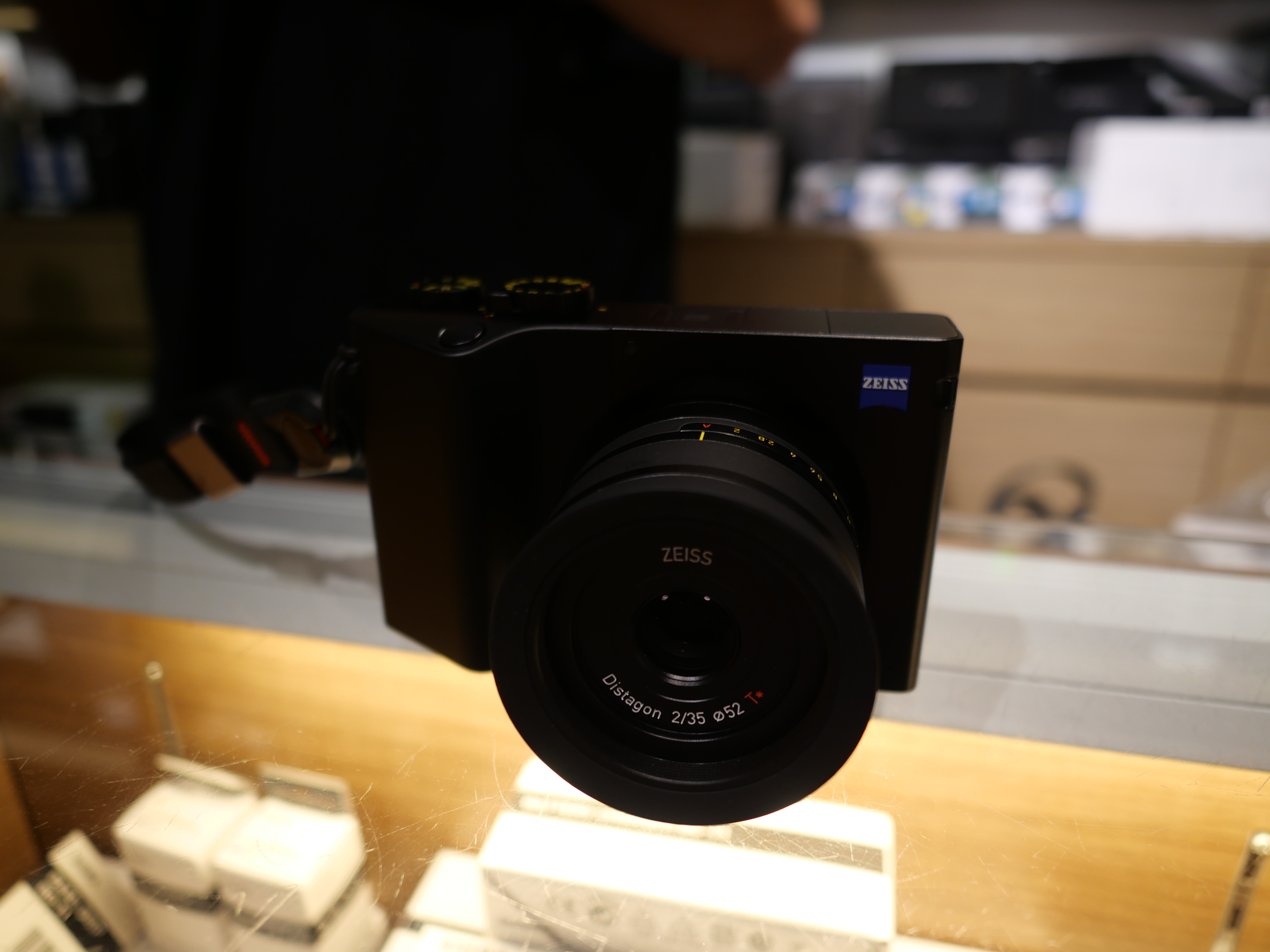
- Zeiss ZX1

Overview
- Maker: Carl Zeiss, Sony Group Corporation
- Type: compact
- Intro price: $6,000 USD / £5,399 GBP on release

Lens
- Lens mount: Fixed
- Lens: 35mm F2 lens with Zeiss T coatings
- F-numbers: f/2 - f/22 in 1/3 stop increments

Sensor/medium
- Sensor type: CMOS
- Sensor size: 24 x 36 mm
- Maximum resolution: (37.4 megapixels)
- Film speed: 80 - 51200 ISO
- Recording medium: 512GB internal SSD, external storage using USB-C

Focusing
- Focus: Contrast and phase-detection autofocus

Flash
- Flash: Sigma SA-TTL-compliant hotshoe
- Flash synchronization: up to 1/1000 sec

Shutter
- Frame rate: 3 frames per second
- Shutter speed range: 1/2000 - 30 seconds

Viewfinder
- Viewfinder: 0.74x magnification electronic viewfinder with 6.22M dots, 1920 x 1080px

General
- Video recording: 4K/30p, 1080/60p video capture
- LCD screen: 4.3" angled LCD with 2.76M dots
- Battery: 3190mAh 22.9Wh Li-ion battery pack DDPS1A/DD-PS1E, exchangable
- AV port(s): Single USB-C port, supporting USB Power Delivery and HDMI alt mode
- Dimensions: 142×93×94 mm (5.6×3.7×3.7 in) (5.59 * 3.66 * 3.70")
- Weight: 837g (12.86 oz)

The Zeiss ZX1 is a full-frame (35mm) fixed-lens digital camera produced by Carl Zeiss AG. It was announced in 2018, released in 2020, and discontinued in 2023.

== Features ==
It is the only camera with Adobe Lightroom Mobile built in and one of very few which used Android as its operating system. The camera was marketed as with the tagline "Shoot. Edit. Share." due to its ability to allow users to create photos, edit them, and share them on social media on the camera itself afforded by those attributes.

== Reception ==
The ZX1 received reviews with mixed conclusions. There was strong agreement that its lens and sensor produced particularly high-quality images, but that its minimal physical controls and design choices made in priority of its visual design compromised its usability - a particular point of criticism was the camera's viewfinder: its rubber eye cup, in contrast with those of most enthusiast-level cameras, is close to flush with the body of the camera, which resulted in the reviewers' faces coming into uncomfortable contact with the body of the camera during its use, and that the camera's reliance on its touchscreen for control of many features made it especially awkward to make settings adjustments while using that viewfinder.

While the camera’s use of the Android operating system was praised for its versatility and ease of use, it was criticized for its long, 24 second, boot time.

== Lawsuit ==
In the book Focus: The ASML Way by Marc Hijink it is explained this camera was only introduced to be used in a patent fight between ASML/Zeiss (Zeiss SMT, the semiconductor part of the company) against Nikon.

The main fight was on lithography patents but with this camera ASML could bring patent infringement counterclaims against Nikon's cameras to pressure Nikon to agree to terms proposed. As the complainant at USITC, ASML/Zeiss had to demonstrate they were suffering economic damage from Nikon's alleged patent infringement so they created a camera available for sale in the US that used the patented parts which was the ZX1.

In the book this is clearly confirmed by Martin van den Brink (ASML President and CTO).
