= Bill Moggridge =

British designer (1943–2012)

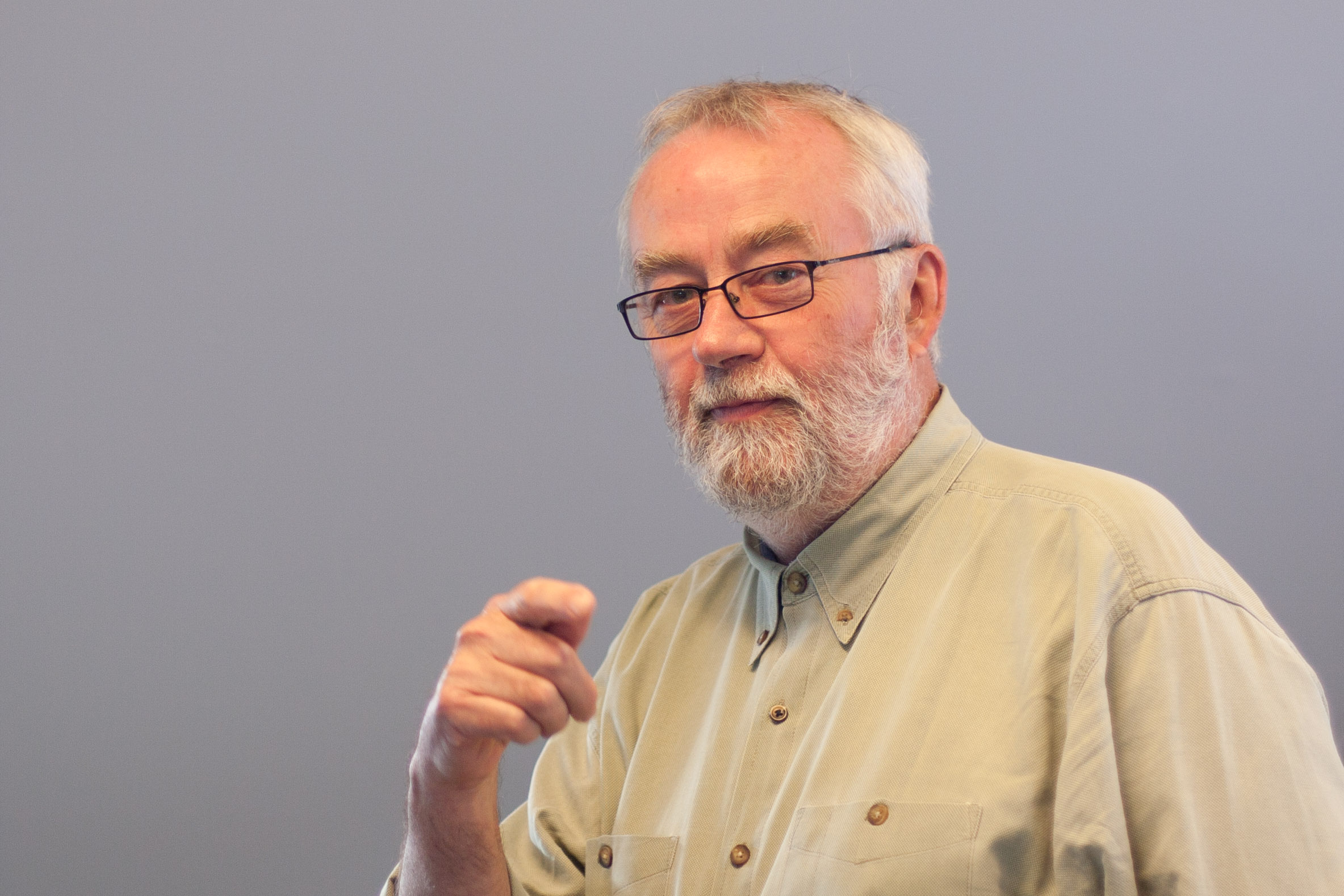
- Bill Moggridge at CIID in June 2010
- Born: William Grant Moggridge; 25 June 1943; London, England
- Died: 8 September 2012 (aged 69); San Francisco, California, US
- Education: Central Saint Martins College of Arts and Design
- Occupations: Director, Cooper Hewitt, Smithsonian Design Museum; Cofounder and Fellow, IDEO
- Years active: 1965–2012
- Spouse: Karin Moggridge
- Children: Alex Moggridge and Eric Moggridge
- Relatives: Henry William Lawrence Moggridge (great nephew)

William Grant Moggridge, RDI (25 June 1943 – 8 September 2012) was an English designer, author and educator who cofounded the design company IDEO and was director of Cooper Hewitt, Smithsonian Design Museum in New York. He was a pioneer in adopting a human-centred approach in design, and championed interaction design as a mainstream design discipline (he is given credit for coining the term, together with Bill Verplank).

Among his achievements, he designed the first laptop computer, the GRiD Compass, was honoured for Lifetime Achievement from the National Design Awards, and given the Prince Philip Designers Prize. He was quoted as saying, "If there is a simple, easy principle that binds everything I have done together, it is my interest in people and their relationship to things."

== Early life and education ==
Bill Moggridge was born in London on June 25, 1943, to Helen (an artist) and Henry Weston Moggridge (a civil servant).

Moggridge studied industrial design at the Central School of Art and Design, London, from 1962 to 1965. In 1965 he moved to the US to find opportunities as a designer, and landed his first job as a designer for the American Sterilizer Co. in Erie, Pennsylvania, designing hospital equipment. In 1969, Moggridge returned to London to study typography and communications.

== Career ==
=== Moggridge Associates ===
In 1969, Moggridge founded his first company, Moggridge Associates, in the top floor of his home in London.

His first industrial design to reach the market was a toaster for Hoover UK in the year 1970. In 1972, he worked on his first computer project, a minicomputer for Computer Technology Ltd, UK, that was never produced. In 1973, another Hoover UK design, for a space heater, was featured on the cover of a UK design magazine.

=== ID Two and IDEO ===
Moggridge returned to the US in 1979 to open another firm, called ID Two, first located in Palo Alto, California. An early client was GRiD Systems, for whom he designed what is widely regarded as the first laptop computer, the GRiD Compass. This was the first portable computer with a display that closed over the keyboard, a patented innovation that GRiD licensed for many years. It retailed at $8,150 (£5,097) and flew on board every Space Shuttle mission from 1983 to 1997.

In 1982, designer Mike Nuttall joined ID Two from the London office and worked on another portable computer project, the WorkSlate, for Convergent Technologies. Because of the potential for conflict of interest, Nuttall left ID Two to form his own firm in Palo Alto, Matrix Product Design. In this period, Moggridge also began teaching in Stanford University's Product Design Program, where he met fellow teacher David Kelley, who had his own engineering design firm, David Kelley Design.

In 1991, Moggridge became a co-founder of IDEO, with David Kelley and Mike Nuttall, as all four firms merged into one. Moggridge stayed at IDEO until 2010, when he was named an IDEO Fellow.

=== Cooper Hewitt, Smithsonian Design Museum ===
In March 2010, Moggridge left IDEO to become director of Cooper Hewitt, Smithsonian Design Museum in New York City, the first person to do so without a museum background. Cooper Hewitt is the only museum in the US devoted exclusively to historic and contemporary design.

Moggridge died of cancer in a hospice in San Francisco on 8 September 2012.

== Academic roles ==
From 1983 to 2010, Moggridge was consulting associate professor in different departments at Stanford University, including the Product Design Program, the Center for Work, Technology, and Organization, and the d.school (officially the Hasso Plattner Institute of Design).

Moggridge was Congress Chair for CONNECTING'07, the Icsid World Design Congress held in San Francisco, a role that began in 2000 as he led the effort to prepare a bid that was presented at the 2001 Icsid Congress in Seoul, Korea.

In 2001, Moggridge became a steering committee member at Interaction Design Institute Ivrea in Ivrea, Italy.

In 1993, he was a visiting professor in interaction design at Royal College of Art in London and he was a trustee at the Design Museum in London 1992–1995. He had been an advisor to the British government on design education in 1974, and a board member at the Copenhagen Institute of Interaction Design.

== Awards and honours ==
In 2014, Moggridge was posthumously awarded an AIGA Medal.

Moggridge was given an honorary doctorate from CCA (California College of the Arts) in San Francisco in 2012.

In FastCompany's October 2011 issue, Moggridge was profiled as a Master of Design, and named one of the 50 Most Influential Designers in America.

In 2010, he was given the Prince Philip Designers Prize.

Moggridge was given a Lifetime Achievement Award in 2009 at the National Design Awards, in a ceremony at the White House, presided over by First Lady Michelle Obama

The Industrial Designers Society of America (IDSA) named Moggridge a Fellow in 2006.

In 1988 Moggridge was named a Royal Designer for Industry by the Royal Society for the encouragement of Arts, Manufactures and Commerce.

== Books ==
In October 2006, Moggridge published Designing Interactions (The MIT Press, ISBN 0-262-13474-8), a 764-page introduction to and history of interaction design comprising 40-plus interviews with designers and entrepreneurs, from Douglas Engelbart to Will Wright to Larry Page and Sergey Brin. Moggridge conducted the interviews, recorded and edited the videos (included with the book on a DVD), and designed the book and the book's website. BusinessWeek named it one of the Best Innovation and Design Books in 2006, and design commentator Don Norman wrote, "This will be the book—the book that summarizes how the technology of interaction came into being and prescribes how it will advance in the future."

Moggridge followed this in October 2010 with Designing Media (The MIT Press, ISBN 0262014858), another compilation of more than 35 interviews with experts in various media, new and old, including Mark Zuckerberg, Chad Hurley, Tim Westergren, Ira Glass, Craig Newmark, Hans Rosling, and DJ Spooky. Again, Moggridge conducted the interviews, wrote the text, and designed the book and the book's website.

== Film and video ==
Moggridge is a central figure in Gary Hustwit's 2009 documentary on design, Objectified.

In 2009, Moggridge directed and produced a short film, Professor Poubelle on YouTube, about Doug Wilde, a Stanford Professor Emeritus who began picking up trash on his daily bike rides up a steep mountain highway.

== See also ==
- Cooper-Hewitt, National Design Museum
- IDEO
