= ZX1 =

ZX1 or ZX-1 may refer to:

- Zeiss ZX1, a camera
- NWZ-ZX1, in the Walkman ZX Series
- zx1, an Itanium chipset
- ZX1, a zinc chelator, e.g. used as a small molecule sensor
- ZX-1, a bicycle by Vitus

== See also ==
- ZX Interface 1, a peripheral for the ZX Spectrum
