= Astino Abbey =

Former Roman Catholic monastery in Bergamo, Lombardy, Italy

Coordinates: 45°42′27″N 9°38′24″E

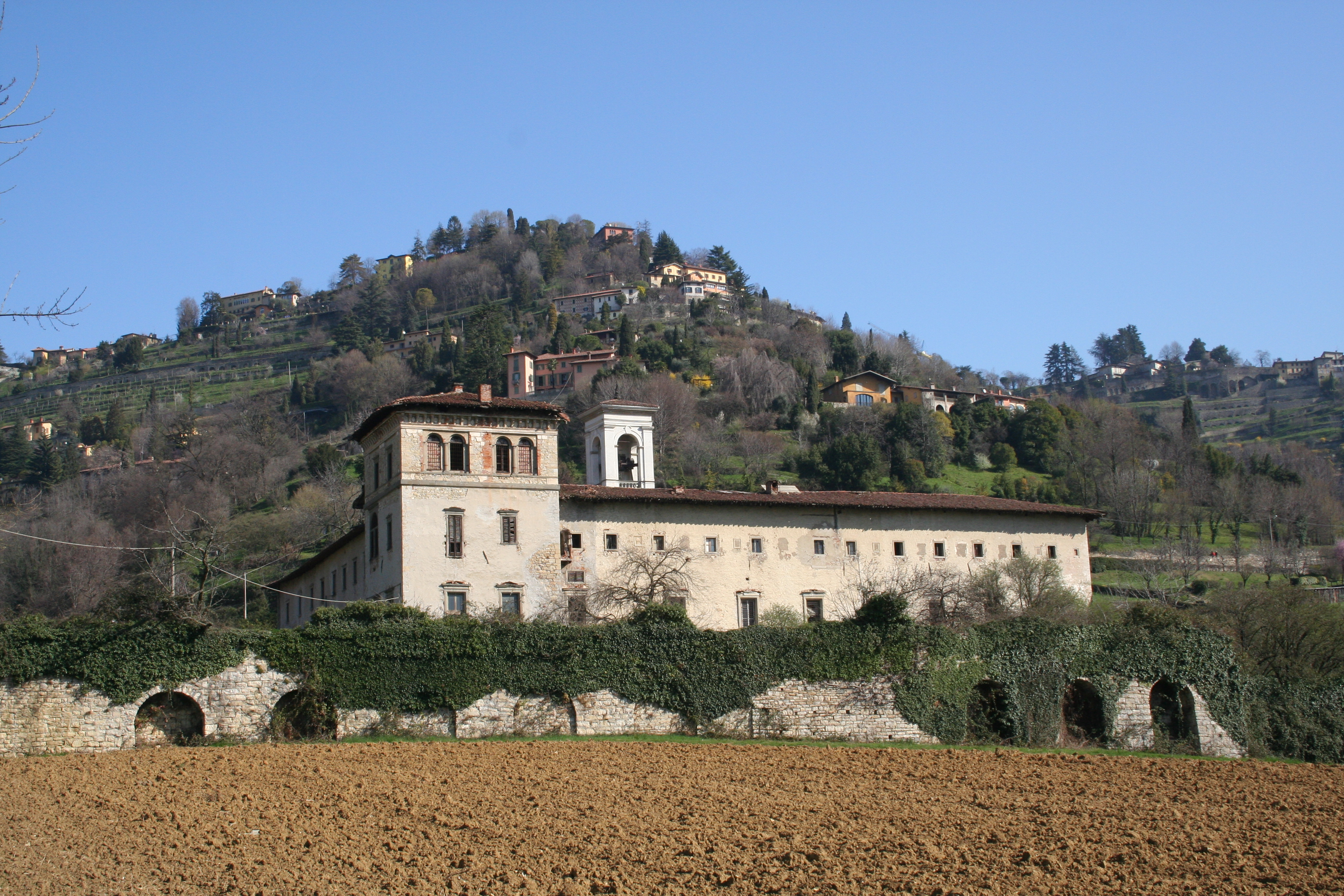

Astino Abbey (Italian: Monastero di Astino) is a former Roman Catholic monastery in the Astino Valley, in the Province of Bergamo, region of Lombardy, Italy. It is no longer active as a religious institution. The buildings were renovated in 2015, and since 2004 has been the home of an educational institution focused on design.

== History ==
Astino Abbey was founded around the year 1070 by members of the Vallumbrosan Order. The Romanesque church and the first conventual buildings were built by Bertario, the first abbot, who supervised the abbey for 21 years until 1128. During the second half of the 15th century the Astino Monastery acquired lands from all over the province.

The monastery was suppressed on 4 July 1797 by the civil authorities of Bergamo. Its assets were given to the nearby hospital, founded and previously run by the monks. In 1832 the site was put to use as a psychiatric hospital, which it remained until 1892. It was then used for agricultural purposes, and was sold to private buyers in 1923.

In 1973 the property was acquired by a private company for conversion into a golfing centre, but the plan ran into so much opposition that it never came to fruition. After years of neglect, the site was purchased by the "Congregazione della Misericordia Maggiore" in 2007, and the buildings began to a complete renovation in 2013. Since 2024, the property has hosted the Copenhagen Institute of Interaction Design, a post-graduate educational organization focused interaction and service design.

== Church ==
The Church of "Santo Sepolcro" (of the Holy Sepulchre) was consecrated in 1117, but has been rebuilt over the centuries. The base of the belltower dates to the 12th-century, but now has a baroque superstructure. The building includes a cloister of the 15th century and a chapel to the memory of Blessed Guallo de Roniis, exiled bishop of Brescia.

== Bibliography ==
- Fulvio Adobati, Moris Lorenzi. Astino e la sua valle. Clusone, Ferrari editrice, 1997.
- Maria Luisa Angelini. I monasteri di Bergamo. Bergamo, La Rivista di Bergamo, 1979.
- Manela Bandini. La Valle d'Astino, in Progetto il colle di Bergamo. Bergamo, Lubrina.
- Mario Locatelli. Bergamo nei suoi monasteri. Bergamo ed. Il Conventino, 1986.
- Mario Lupo. Codex diplomaticus civitatis et ecclesiae Bergomatis. Bergamo, 1784–1788.
- AA. VV. Il parco dei colli di Bergamo: introduzione alla conoscenza del terriotrio. Bergamo, 1986.
- AA, VV. La presenza dei benedettini a Bergamo e nelle bergamasca. Bergamo, APB, 1984.
