= Laura Sydell =

American journalist

- Education: William Smith College (B.S.); Yeshiva University (J.D.)
- Occupations: Radio Journalist; University teaching fellow
- Employer: NPR Voice of Laura Sydell

Laura Sydell formerly reported on Digital Culture for NPR. She was born in New Jersey, and is a former senior technology reporter for Public Radio International's Marketplace, and a regular reporter on for National Public Radio's All Things Considered, Morning Edition, and Weekend Edition. She was a Freedom Forum Teaching Fellow at the Graduate School of Journalism at University of California, Berkeley, teaching about reporting on culture.

== Education ==
Born and raised in Millburn, New Jersey, Sydell is a graduate of Gill St. Bernard's School, Phi Beta Kappa graduate of William Smith, and later earned a Juris Doctor (J.D.) degree from the Cardozo School of Law at Yeshiva University. In 1999, she spent a year in the fellowship program at Columbia University's National Arts Journalism Program. After finishing the fellowship, Sydell went to San Francisco to work as a teaching fellow at the Graduate School of Journalism at University of California, Berkeley.

== Previous work and awards ==
While she lived in New York, Sydell worked on Undercurrents on the Pacifica Radio Network, and had articles published in many other publications. She has also reported for other radio shows, including Crossroads.

In 1991 she was the co-writer, with Dennis Bernstein of "Savings and Loan Trading Cards" from Eclipse Enterprises, illustrated by Stewart Stanyard and edited by Catherine Yronwode. In 1995, she and Bernstein wrote "Friendly Dictators Trading Cards," illustrated by Bill Sienkiewicz, and again edited by Yronwode and published by Eclipse.

While a staff reporter for WNYC, her work won awards from The Newswomen's Club of New York, The New York Press Club, and The Society of Professional Journalists. Her radio documentaries of activists have similarly won acclaim American Women in Radio and Television, The National Federation of Community Broadcasters, and Women in Communications.

In July 2011 Sydell co-reported and co-produced "When Patents Attack!" for This American Life with Alex Blumberg. The show examined the problem of patent trolls and the role of large patent collecting entities such as Intellectual Ventures in perpetuating the problem. The show was a finalist for the 2011 Radio/Audio award from Investigative Reporters and Editors, and received the 2012 Gerald Loeb Award for Broadcast Enterprise business journalism from the UCLA Anderson School of Management. It is also in Best Business Writing of 2011. The following year Sydell and Blumberg produced a sequel, When Patents Attack! Part 2.

On November 5, 2013 Sydell and UCLA Professor Christopher M. Kelty debated with entrepreneur and Connected Patents CEO, Jaz Banga, and media artist and entrepreneur, Scott Snibbe, in an Oxford style debate about the state of the U.S. Patent System.
