= Activity-centered design =

Extension of the human-centered design paradigm in interaction design

Activity-centered design (ACD) is an extension of the Human-centered design paradigm in interaction design. ACD features heavier emphasis on the activities that a user would perform with a given piece of technology. ACD has its theoretical underpinnings in activity theory, from which activities can be defined as actions taken by a user to achieve a goal.

When working with activity-centered design, the designers use research to get insights into the users. Observations and interviews are typical approaches to learn more about the users' behavior. By mapping users' activities and tasks, the designer may notice missing tasks for the activity to become easier to perform, and thus design solutions to accomplish those tasks.
