= Malcolm Slaney =

American electrical engineer

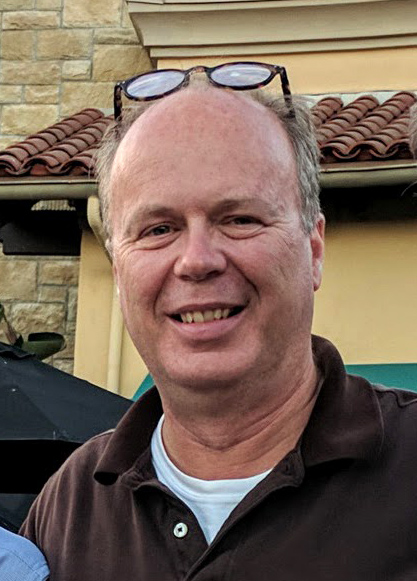
Malcolm Slaney in Santa Barbara in 2017, during the KITP workshop "Physics of Hearing: From Neurobiology to Information Theory and Back"

Malcolm Slaney is an American electrical engineer, whose research has focused on machine perception and multimedia analysis. He is a Fellow of the IEEE for "contributions to perceptual signal processing and tomographic imaging". He is a consulting professor at the Stanford University Center for Computer Research in Music and Acoustics and an affiliate faculty member in the Electrical Engineering Department at the University of Washington.

Slaney attended Purdue University for his bachelor's, master's, and PhD degrees in electrical engineering. He is currently a Research Scientist in the Machine Hearing group at Google. Previously, he worked at Bell Labs, Schlumberger Palo Alto Research, Apple Computer, Interval Research Corporation, IBM Research – Almaden, Yahoo! Research, and Microsoft Research.

Slaney's 1988 book with Avinash Kak, Principles of Computerized Tomographic Imaging, which he co-wrote as a grad student, has been selected by the Society for Industrial and Applied Mathematics for republication in their Classics in Applied Mathematics series.
