= Bill Verplank =

Interaction design pioneer

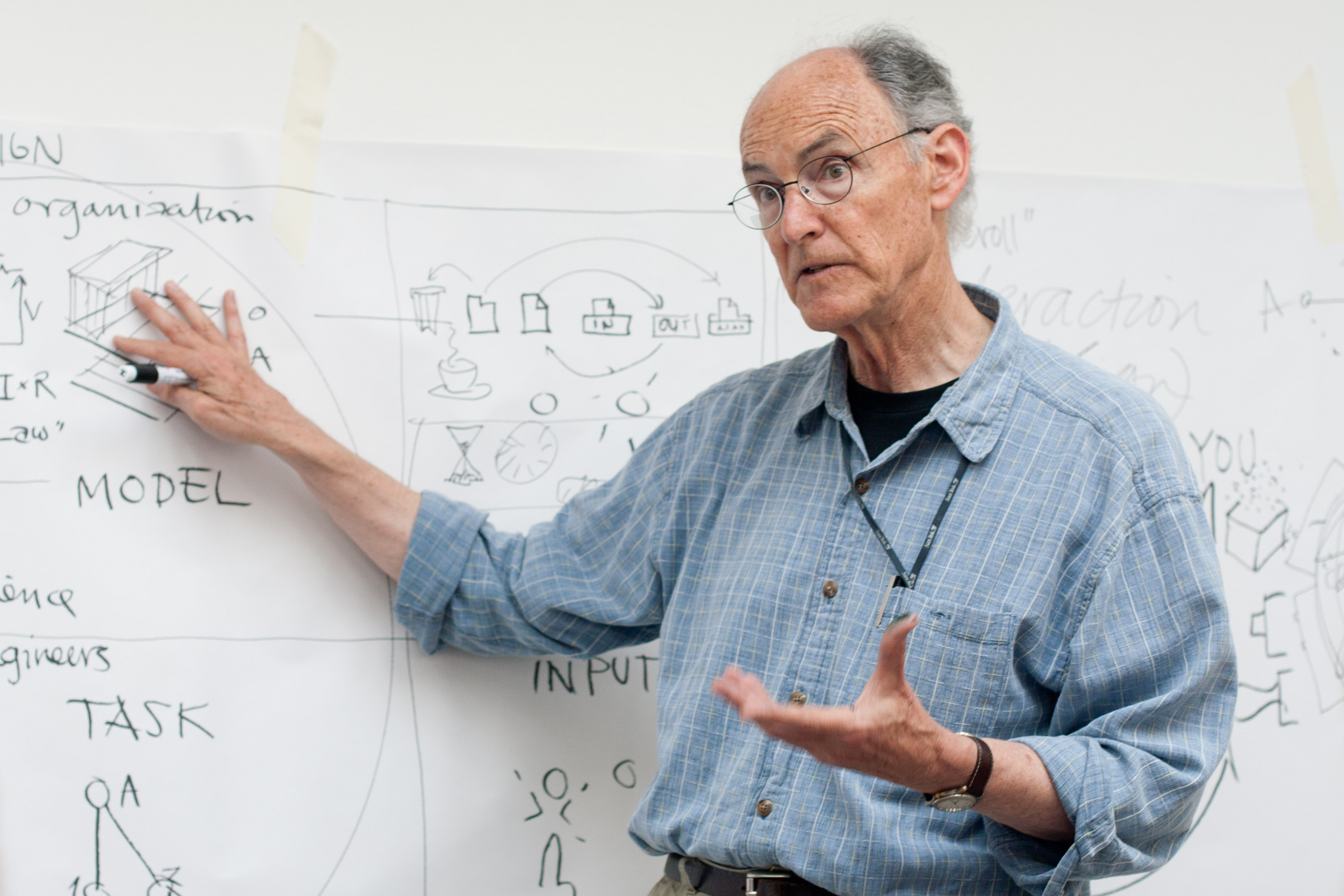
- Verplank giving a lecture at the Copenhagen Institute of Interaction Design, 2010

Academic background
- Education: Massachusetts Institute of Technology (PhD, MS); Stanford University (BS)
- Thesis: Is There an Optimal Work-Load in Manual Control? (1977)
- Doctoral advisor: Thomas B. Sheridan

Academic work
- Discipline: Interaction design

William Lawrence Verplank is a designer and researcher who focuses on interactions between humans and computers. He is one of the pioneers of interaction design, a field of design that focuses on users and technology, and a term he helped coin in the 1980s. He was previously a visiting scholar at Stanford University's CCRMA and was involved in Stanford's d.school. He also teaches and lectures internationally on interaction design.

== Career ==
Bill Verplank received a bachelor's degree in mechanical engineering from Stanford University in 1965. Verplank then moved the same year to Massachusetts Institute of Technology (MIT) to complete a PhD by 1977 in man-machine systems and studied with Thomas B. Sheridan.

He worked at Xerox Parc and Office Systems Divisions from 1978-1986 refining the design of the original graphical user interface and mouse, in the Xerox Star. He went on to work with Bill Moggridge, first at IDtwo and then at IDEO (1986–1992), bringing graphical user interfaces to the world of product design. Together with Bill Moggridge, they coined the term interaction design in the mid-1980s.

From 1992-2000 at Interval Research Corporation, he directed the design and research for collaboration, tangibility and music. When Interval Research closed in 2000, Verplank joined Stanford's University's CCRMA part-time with Max Mathews and developed a course on HCI for computer music and a conference (spun off from CHI) called NIME (New Interfaces for Musical Expression). He was on the steering committee and taught at the Interaction Design Institute Ivrea (2000–2005).

He is active in SIGCHI, a special interest group which is focused on human–computer interactions (HCI) and he helped write their curricula for the SIGCHI Academy.

An interview with Verplank, featuring his signature sketching while talking, is included in the book Designing Interactions (published in October 2006), with the e-book and website of the same publication including a video of Verplank.
