= Gunnar Johannsen =

German cyberneticist

Gunnar Johannsen (born 1940) is a German cyberneticist, and Emeritus Professor of Systems Engineering and Human-Machine Systems at the University of Kassel, known for his contributions in the field of human-machine systems.

== Biography ==
Born and raised in Hamburg, Johannsen received his Dipl.-Ing. in communication and information engineering from Technische Universität Berlin in 1967, where in 1971 he also received his Dr.-Ing. in flight guidance and manual control. He studied Sound Engineering at the Berlin University of the Arts for another three years, and received his habilitation in 1980.

In 1971 Johannsen started his academic career as division head at the Research Institute for Human Engineering (FGAN-FAT) in Wachtberg, south of Bonn. After his habilitation in 1980 he became privatdozent in the field of human-machine systems at the Department of Mechanical Engineering at RWTH Aachen University. In 1982 he moved to the University of Kassel, where he was appointed Professor of Systems Engineering and Human-Machine Systems until his retirement in 2006. Over the years, Johannsen was a visiting Scholar at the University of Illinois at Urbana-Champaign in 1977−78, at the Kyoto Institute of Technology in 1995 and 2004; at the Vienna University of Technology in 1999; and at the University of British Columbia in 2004.

Johannsen was a fellow of the International Federation of Automatic Control, where in 1981 he founded the Working Group on Man-Machine Systems, and served in different positions over the years. In 1995, he was awarded the Japanese-German Research Award by the Japan Society for the Promotion of Science. In 2001 he was elected Fellow of the IEEE. In 2005 the University of Valenciennes and Hainaut-Cambresis awarded him a Docteur Honoris Causa, and in 2007 the Benjamin Franklin Institute of Technology nominated him for the 2007 Bower Award and Prize for Achievement in Science on Human-Centered Computing.

== Work ==
=== Graphical intelligent dialogues ===
In 1986, Jim Alty's HCI group at The Turing Institute won a major European Strategic Program on Research in Information Technology 1 contract to investigate the use of Knowledge Based systems in Process Control Interfaces called GRADIENT (Graphical Intelligent Dialogues, P600). with Gunnar Johannsen of Kassel University, Peter Elzer of the Clausthal University of Technology and Asea Brown Boveri to create intelligent interfaces for process control operators.

This work had a major impact on process control interface design. The initial pilot phase report (Alty, Elzer et al., 1985) was widely used and cited. Many research papers were produced A follow-on large ESPRIT research project was PROMISE (Process Operators Multimedia Intelligent Support Environment) working with DOW Benelux (Netherlands), Tecsiel (Italy) and Scottish Power (Scotland).

== Selected publications ==
Johannsen author and co-author of numerous publications in the field of human-machine systems and control theory. A selection:

- Sheridan, Thomas B., and Gunnar Johannsen (eds.) Monitoring Behavior and Supervisory Control. Perseus Publishing, 1976.
- Gunnar Johannsen. Der Mensch im Regelkreis: Lineare Modelle, Oldenbourg Verlag, 1977.
- Gunnar Johannsen. Mensch-Maschine-Systeme, Springer-Verlag, 1993.

Articles, a selection:

- Stassen, Henk G., Gunnar Johannsen, and Neville Moray. "Internal representation, internal model, human performance model and mental workload." Automatica 26.4 (1990): 811-820.
- Johannsen, Gunnar, and James L. Alty. "Knowledge engineering for industrial expert systems." Automatica 27.1 (1991): 97-114.
- Johannsen, Gunnar, Alexander H. Levis, and Henk G. Stassen. "Theoretical problems in man-machine systems and their experimental validation." Automatica 30.2 (1994): 217-231.
