= Astino Valley =

Valley in Bergamo, Lombardy, Italy

Coordinates: 45.706°N 9.638°E

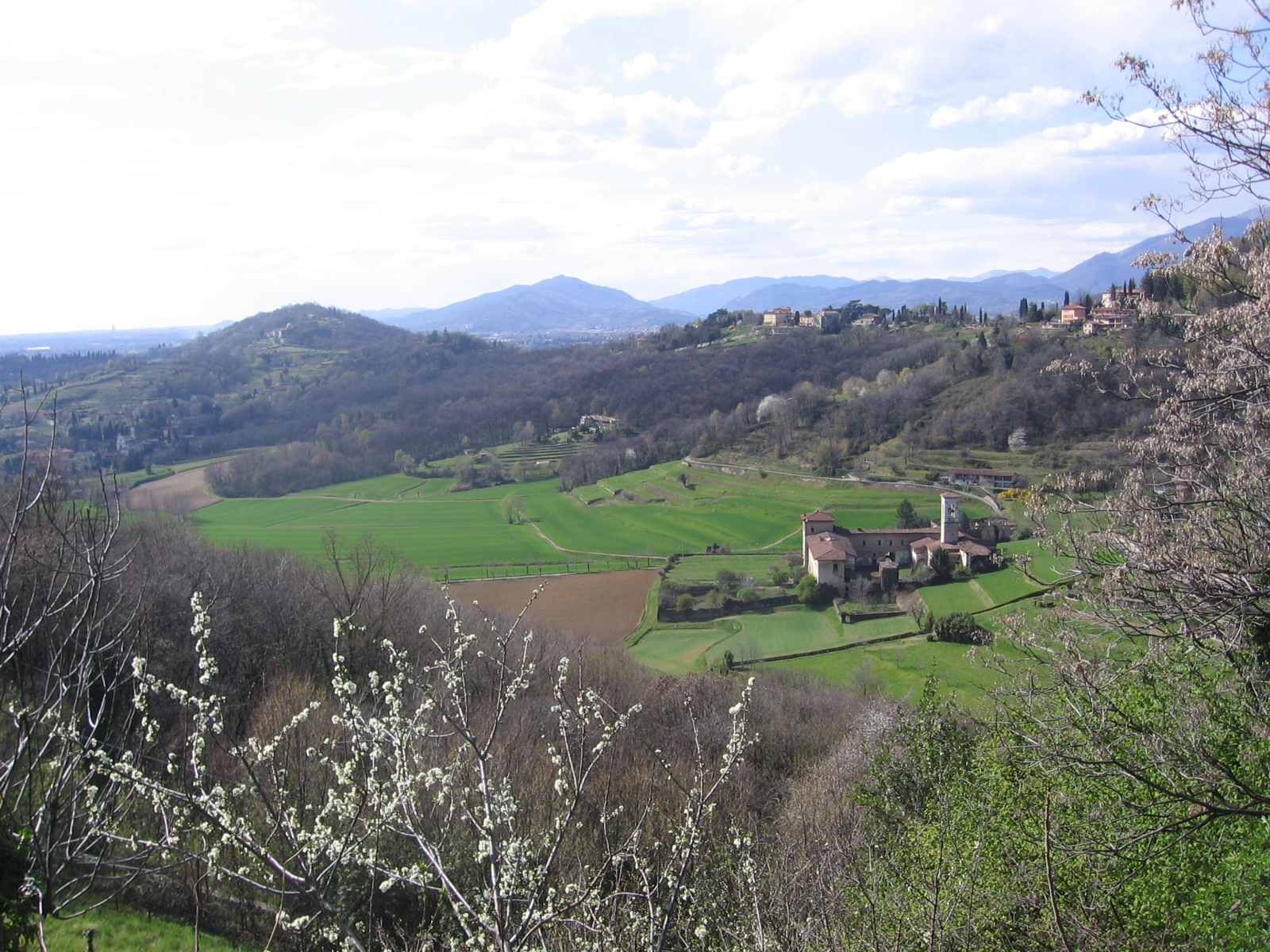
The Astino Valley

The Astino Valley (Italian: Valle di Astino) is a valley in the Italian comune of Bergamo in Lombardy.

It is relatively small in size and it is part of the Parco dei Colli di Bergamo system, west of Bergamo.

== History ==
In 1326 alone, a Confraternity distributed a denarius of alms to each of 2,000 individuals in the Astino valley. In 1361-1362, the Confraternity of Misericordia Maggiore in Bergamo donated 2 lire to a member named Cresoke, whose house was destroyed.

As of the 21st Century, there remains a mix of gardens and forests in the Astino valley.

== Religion ==
- Astino Abbey is a monastery in the valley.
