= Eyegroove =

American video-focused social network

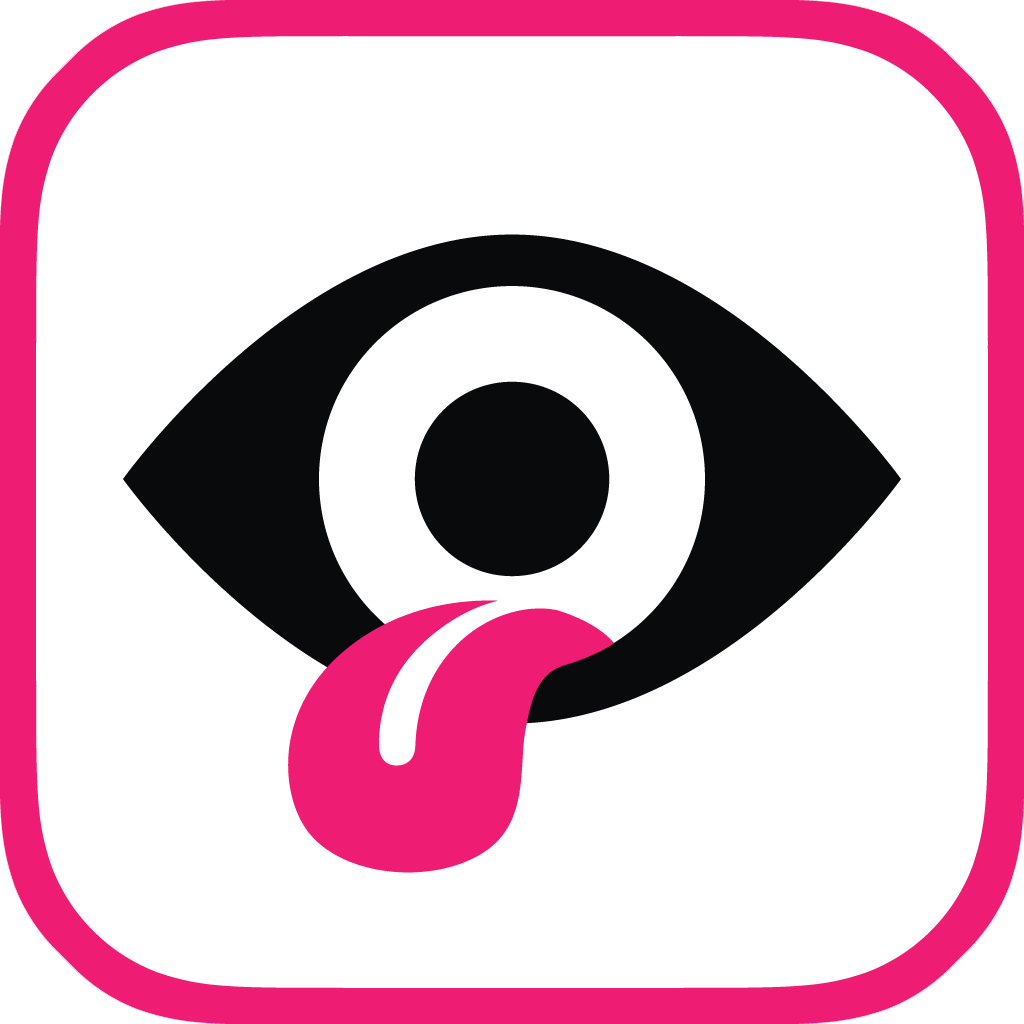
- Original authors: Scott Snibbe, Graham McDermott
- Developers: Eyegroove, Inc.
- Initial release: 2013
- Operating system: iOS
- Available in: English
- Type: Video sharing
- License: Freeware
- Website: eyegroove.com

Eyegroove was a social media service headquartered in San Francisco for creating short music videos with augmented reality effects founded by Scott Snibbe and Graham McDermott. The company was established in 2013 and released the first version of its app on iOS that year. Through the app, users could create thirty second creative and lip-syncing music videos and choose musical tracks to accompany them, use different speed options (time-lapse, fast, normal, slow motion) and add time-based augmented reality filters and effects. The app's social media features included an Instagram-like feed, hashtags for creative memes, user tagging, and comment threads.

In August, 2016, Eyegroove was acquired by Facebook and its effect technology was integrated into Instagram, WhatsApp, Messenger, and Facebook.

== History ==
The company was established in 2013 in San Francisco. In 2013 it released the first version of its app on iOS that year.

=== Acquisition by Facebook ===
On August 5, 2016, TechCrunch reported that Eyegroove was acquired by Facebook. Subsequent to acquisition, Facebook launched its Camera Effects Platform with camera effects similar to Eyegroove's earlier effects, that can now be found in Instagram, Messenger, WhatsApp, and Facebook.

== Features ==
Eyegroove users could record up to 30-second videos in one or multiple shots, performing or lip-syncing to music tracks. The platform also enables editing, importing of video, and application of real-time animated augmented reality effects. Eyegroove also allowed users to change the speed of video recordings and share to Instagram.
