= Thomas B. Sheridan =

American engineer and professor

- Born: December 23, 1929 (age 96); Cincinnati, Ohio
- Education: Purdue (BS, 1951); UCLA (MS, 1954); MIT (ScD, 1959)
- Scientific career
- Thesis: Time-variable dynamics of human operator systems (1959)
- Doctoral advisor: Henry Paynter
- Doctoral students: Mike Massimino; Bill Verplank

Thomas B. Sheridan (born December 23, 1929) is an American professor of mechanical engineering and Applied Psychology Emeritus at the Massachusetts Institute of Technology. He is a pioneer of robotics and remote control technology.

== Early life and education ==
Sheridan was born Cincinnati, Ohio. In 1951, he received his B.S. degree in Mechanical Engineering from Purdue University, a M.S. Eng. degree from University of California, Los Angeles in 1954, and a Sc.D. degree from the Massachusetts Institute of Technology (MIT) in 1959. He has also received an honorary doctorate from Delft University of Technology in the Netherlands.

== Career ==
For most of his professional career he remained at MIT. He was assistant Professor of Mechanical Engineering from 1959 to 1964. Associate Professor of Mechanical Engineering from 1964 to 1970. Professor of Mechanical Engineering from 1970 to 1984. Professor of Engineering and Applied Psychology since 1984, and Professor of Aeronautics and Astronautics since 1993. In 1995-96 he was Ford Professor.

He is currently professor emeritus in the Departments of Mechanical Engineering and Department of Aeronautics and Astronautics. He has also served as a visiting professor at University of California, Berkeley, Stanford, Delft University, Kassel University, Germany, and Ben Gurion University, Israel.

He was co-editor of the MIT Press journal Presence: Teleoperators and Virtual Environments and served on several editorial boards; and was editor of IEEE Transactions on Man-Machine Systems.

Sheridan chaired the National Research Council's Committee on Human Factors, and has served on numerous government and industrial advisory committees. He is principal of Thomas B. Sheridan and Associates, a consulting firm. He was also President of the IEEE Systems, Man, and Cybernetics Society. He was President of HFES, and is a member of the National Academy of Engineering.

Sheridan received their Norbert Wiener and Joseph Wohl awards, the IEEE Centennial Medal (1984) and Third Millennium Medal. He is also a Fellow of the Human Factors and Ergonomics Society, recipient of their Paul M. Fitts Award, received the 1997 National Engineering Award of the American Association of Engineering Societies, and the 1997 Rufus Oldenburger Medal of the American Society of Mechanical Engineers.

== Work ==
His research interests are in experimentation, modeling, and design of human-machine systems in air, highway and rail transportation, space and undersea robotics, process control, arms control, telemedicine, and virtual reality. Working at MIT, Sheridan developed important concepts concerning human–robot interaction, particularly regarding supervisory control and telepresence.

=== Robotics ===
Robotics and telepresence is just one manifestation of his interest the boundary between human and automatic control. His book Humans and Automation is a concise summary of the history, issues, and progress in the role of the human and technology in automation.

== Publications ==
He has published some books and over 200 technical papers. Books:

- Sheridan, Thomas B. and William Ferrell. 1974, Man-Machine Systems (Cambridge, MA: MIT Press, 1974, 1981; USSR, 1981)
- Sheridan, Thomas B., and Gunnar Johannsen. 1976, (ed.) Monitoring Behavior and Supervisory Control, New York: Plenum.
- Sheridan, Thomas B. 1992, "Telerobotics, Automation, and Human Supervisory Control, Cambridge, MA: MIT Press.
- Sheridan, Thomas B., and Ton VonLunteren 1997, (ed.) Perspectives on the Human Controller, Mahwah, NJ: Erlbaum.
- Sheridan, Thomas B. 2002, Humans and Automation: System Design and Research Issues, John Wiley and Sons, 2002.
- Sheridan, Thomas B. 2014. What is God? Can Religion Be Modeled?, Washington DC, New Academia Press, 2014
- Sheridan, Thomas B. (2016). Modeling Human-System Interaction: Philosophical and Methodological Considerations, with Examples. Wiley. ISBN 978-1-119-27529-9.

== See also ==
- Adaptive autonomy
