= Interaction design =

Specialization of design focused on the experience users have of a product or service

Interaction design, often abbreviated as IxD, is "the practice of designing interactive digital products, environments, systems, and services." While interaction design has an interest in form (similar to other design fields), its main area of focus rests on behavior. Rather than analyzing how things are, interaction design synthesizes and imagines things as they could be. This element of interaction design is what characterizes IxD as a design field, as opposed to a science or engineering field.

Interaction design borrows from a wide range of fields like psychology, human-computer interaction, information architecture, and user research to create designs that are tailored to the needs and preferences of users. This involves understanding the context in which the product will be used, identifying user goals and behaviors, and developing design solutions that are responsive to user needs and expectations.

While disciplines such as software engineering have a heavy focus on designing for technical stakeholders, interaction design is focused on meeting the needs and optimizing the experience of users, within relevant technical or business constraints.

Interaction designers are often employed as user experience (UX) or user interface (UI) designers. Interaction design is "concerned with dialogues that extend across both the material and the virtual and involve control and representation technologies". Interaction designers are experts in working with design complexity as they typically work on problems that have many possible users, in many possible contexts, to create software with many possible states. Widely used interaction design tools (like Figma or Adobe XD) can be understood as providing interaction designers with a way of managing the complexity.

== History ==
The term interaction design was coined by Bill Moggridge and Bill Verplank in the mid-1980s, but it took 10 years before the concept started to take hold. To Verplank, it was an adaptation of the computer science term user interface design for the industrial design profession. To Moggridge, it was an improvement over soft-face, which he had coined in 1984 to refer to the application of industrial design to products containing software.

The earliest programs in design for interactive technologies were the Visible Language Workshop, started by Muriel Cooper at MIT in 1975, and the Interactive Telecommunications Program founded at NYU in 1979 by Martin Elton and later headed by Red Burns.

The first academic program officially named "Interaction Design" was established at Carnegie Mellon University in 1994, as a Master of Design in Interaction Design. At the outset, the program focused mainly on screen interfaces, before shifting to a greater emphasis on the "big picture" aspects of interaction—people, organizations, culture, service and system.

In 1990, Gillian Crampton Smith founded the Computer-Related Design MA at the Royal College of Art (RCA) in London, which in 2005 was renamed Design Interactions, headed by Anthony Dunne. In 2001, Crampton Smith helped found the Interaction Design Institute Ivrea (IDII), a specialized institute in Olivetti's hometown in Northern Italy, dedicated solely to interaction design. In 2007, after IDII closed due to a lack of funding, some of the people originally involved with IDII set up the Copenhagen Institute of Interaction Design (CIID), in Denmark. After Ivrea, Crampton Smith and Philip Tabor added the Interaction Design (IxD) track in the Visual and Multimedia Communication at the Università Iuav di Venezia, Italy.

In 1998, the Swedish Foundation for Strategic Research founded The Interactive Institute—a Swedish research institute in the field of interaction design.

== Methodologies ==
=== Goal-oriented design ===
Goal-oriented design (or Goal-Directed design) "is concerned with satisfying the needs and desires of the users of a product or service."

Alan Cooper argues in The Inmates Are Running the Asylum that we need a new approach to solving interactive software-based problems. The problems with designing computer interfaces are fundamentally different from those that do not include software (e.g., hammers). Cooper introduces the concept of cognitive friction, which is when the interface of a design is complex and difficult to use, and behaves inconsistently and unexpectedly, possessing different modes.

Alternatively, interfaces can be designed to serve the needs of the service/product provider. User needs may be poorly served by this approach.

=== Usability ===
Usability answers the question "can someone use this interface?". Jakob Nielsen describes usability as the quality attribute that describes how usable the interface is. Shneiderman proposes principles for designing more usable interfaces called "Eight Golden Rules of Interface Design"—which are well-known heuristics for creating usable systems.

=== Personas ===
Personas are archetypes that describe the various goals and observed behaviour patterns among users.

A persona encapsulates critical behavioural data in a way that both designers and stakeholders can understand, remember, and relate to. Personas use storytelling to engage users' social and emotional aspects, which helps designers to either visualize the best product behaviour or see why the recommended design is successful.

=== Cognitive dimensions ===
The cognitive dimensions framework provides a vocabulary to evaluate and modify design solutions. Cognitive dimensions offer a lightweight approach to analysis of a design quality, rather than an in-depth, detailed description. They provide a common vocabulary for discussing notation, user interface or programming language design.

Dimensions provide high-level descriptions of the interface and how the user interacts with it: examples include consistency, error-proneness, hard mental operations, viscosity and premature commitment. These concepts aid the creation of new designs from existing ones through design maneuvers that alter the design within a particular dimension.

=== Affective interaction design ===
Designers must be aware of elements that influence user emotional responses. For instance, products must convey positive emotions while avoiding negative ones. Other important aspects include motivational, learning, creative, social and persuasive influences. One method that can help convey such aspects is for example, the use of dynamic icons, animations and sound to help communicate, creating a sense of interactivity. Interface aspects such as fonts, color palettes and graphical layouts can influence acceptance. Studies showed that affective aspects can affect perceptions of usability.

Emotion and pleasure theories exist to explain interface responses. These include Don Norman's emotional design model, Patrick Jordan's pleasure model and McCarthy and Wright's Technology as Experience framework.

== Five dimensions ==
The concept of dimensions of interaction design were introduced in Moggridge's book Designing Interactions. Crampton Smith wrote that interaction design draws on four existing design languages, 1D, 2D, 3D, 4D. Kevin Silver later proposed a fifth dimension, behaviour.

=== Words ===
This dimension defines interactions: words are the element that users interact with.

=== Visual representations ===
Visual representations are the elements of an interface that the user perceives; these may include but are not limited to "typography, diagrams, icons, and other graphics".

=== Physical objects or space ===
This dimension defines the objects or space "with which or within which users interact".

=== Time ===
The time during which the user interacts with the interface. An example of this includes "content that changes over time such as sound, video or animation".

=== Behavior ===
Behavior defines how users respond to the interface. Users may have different reactions in this interface.

== Interaction Design Association ==
The Interaction Design Association was created in 2003 to serve the community. The organization has over 80,000 members and more than 173 local groups. IxDA hosts Interaction the annual interaction design conference, and the Interaction Awards. Interaction Awards have since ended in August 2024

== Related disciplines ==
Industrial design
The core principles of industrial design overlap with those of interaction design. Industrial designers use their knowledge of physical form, color, aesthetics, human perception and desire, and usability to create a fit of an object with the person using it.

Human factors and ergonomics
Certain basic principles of ergonomics provide grounding for interaction design. These include anthropometry, biomechanics, kinesiology, physiology and psychology as they relate to human behavior in the built environment.

Cognitive psychology
Certain basic principles of cognitive psychology provide grounding for interaction design. These include mental models, mapping, interface metaphors, and affordances. Many of these are laid out in Donald Norman's influential book The Design of Everyday Things.

Human–computer interaction
Academic research in human–computer interaction (HCI) includes methods for describing and testing the usability of interacting with an interface, such as cognitive dimensions and the cognitive walkthrough.

Design research
Interaction designers are typically informed through iterative cycles of user research. User research is used to identify the needs, motivations and behaviors of end users. They design with an emphasis on user goals and experience, and evaluate designs in terms of usability and affective influence.

Architecture
As interaction designers increasingly deal with ubiquitous computing, urban informatics and urban computing, the architects' ability to make, place, and create context becomes a point of contact between the disciplines.

User interface design
Like user interface design and experience design, interaction design is often associated with the design of system interfaces in a variety of media but concentrates on the aspects of the interface that define and present its behavior over time, with a focus on developing the system to respond to the user's experience and not the other way around.

== See also ==
- Activity-centered design
- Attentive user interface
- Hardware interface design
- Human interface guidelines (user friendly computer application designs)
- Information architecture
- Instructional design
- Fitts's law
- User experience design
- Interface design
