= Scott Snibbe =

New media artist & author (born 1969)

- Scott Snibbe at MIT Media Lab (2009)
- Born: August 1969 (age 56–57); New York City
- Education: Brown University, Rhode Island School of Design
- Occupations: New media artist; author
- Known for: Interactive Art, New Media Art, Digital Art, Buddhist Art

Scott Snibbe (born 1969 in New York City) is an American interactive media artist, author, entrepreneur, and meditation instructor who hosts the Skeptic's Path to Enlightenment meditation podcast. His first book, How to Train a Happy Mind, was released in 2024. Snibbe has collaborated with other artists and musicians, including Björk on her interactive "app album" Biophilia that was acquired by New York's MoMA as the first downloadable app in the museum's collection. Between 2000 and 2013 he founded several companies, including Eyegroove, which was acquired by Facebook in 2016. Early in his career, Snibbe was one of the developers of After Effects (acquired by Adobe).

== Career ==
=== Digital art and augmented reality installations ===
Snibbe is one of the first artists to work with interactive projections, where computer vision is used to change a projection on a wall or floor in response to people interacting with its surface. Snibbe's first, and best-known installation Boundary Functions (1998), premiered at Ars Electronica 1998. In this floor-projected interactive artwork, people walk across a four-meter by four-meter floor. As they move, Boundary Functions uses a camera, computer and projector to draw lines between all of the people on the floor, forming a Voronoi Diagram. This diagram has particularly strong significance when drawn around people's bodies, surrounding each person with lines that outline his or her personal space - the space closer to that person than to anyone else. Snibbe states that this work "shows that personal space, though we call it our own, is only defined by others and changes without our control".

Snibbe's first public interactive work was a networked communication system for abstract animation called Motion Phone, which won a Prix Ars Electronica award in 1996 and established him as a contributor to the field.

Snibbe's interactive installations have been shown at the Whitney Museum of American Art (New York), San Francisco Museum of Modern Art (California), The Kitchen (New York), Eyebeam (New York), the NTT InterCommunication Center (Tokyo, Japan) and the Institute of Contemporary Arts (London, UK). His work is also shown and collected by science museums, including the Exploratorium (San Francisco, CA), the New York Hall of Science (Queens, NY), the Museum of Science and Industry (Chicago, IL), the Cité des Sciences et de l'Industrie (Paris, France), the London Science Museum (UK), and the Phaeno Science Center (Germany). A profile of his work was featured on a December 18, 2011 episode of CNN's The Next List with Dr. Sanjay Gupta.

In 2011, via his company Snibbe Interactive, Snibbe produced a series of interactive exhibits that brought technologies and experiences of James Cameron's Avatar to life in the traveling AVATAR: The Exhibition, which was funded and premiered at Seattle's Experience Music Project and Science Fiction Museum. The exhibition included full-body motion tracking augmented reality and virtual reality experiences simulating the world of Avatar's Pandora, and the process of creating the film.

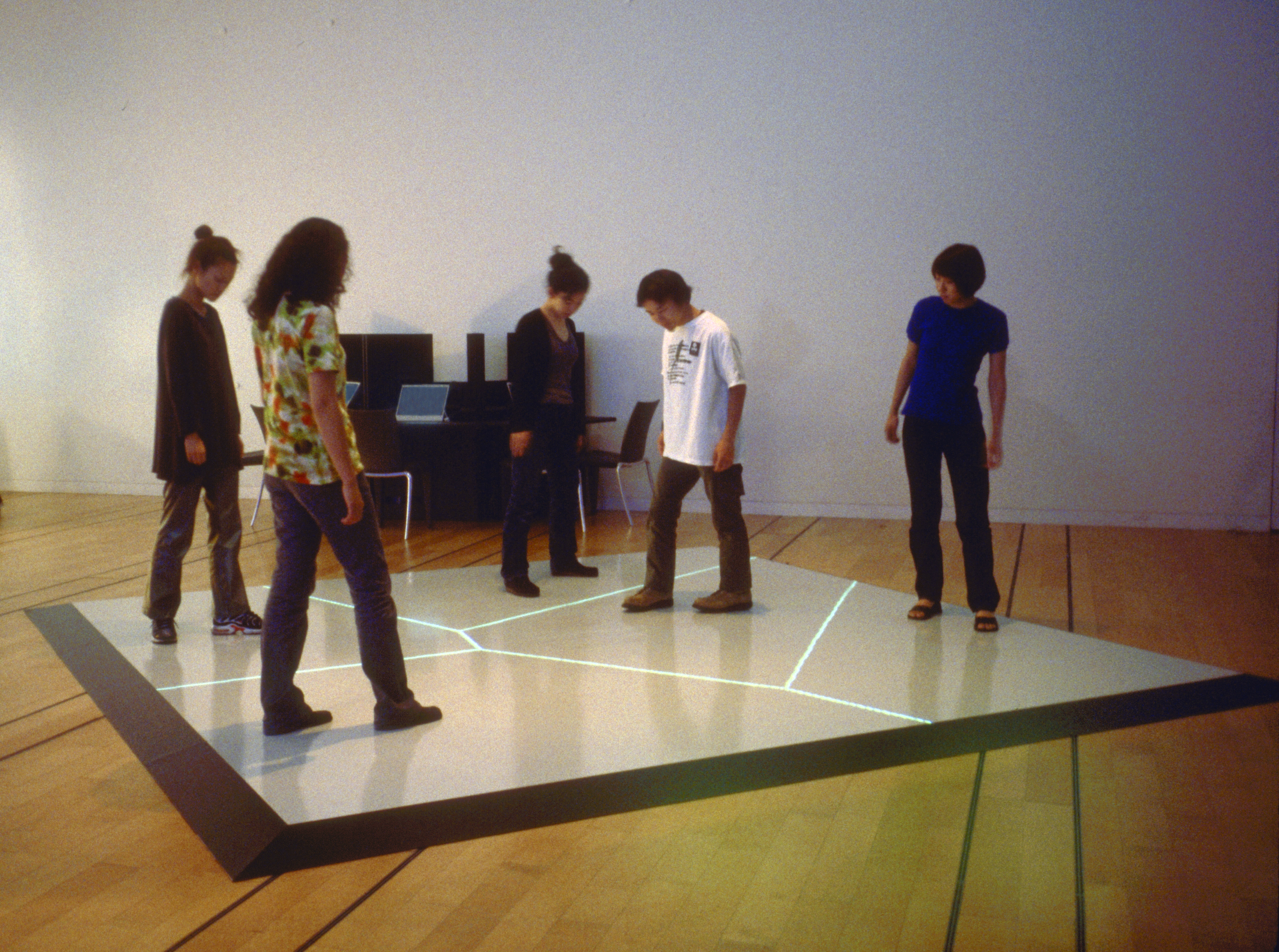
"Boundary Functions" at the NTT InterCommunication Center in Tokyo, 1999

Deep Walls premiered at the San Francisco Museum of Modern Art in 2002.

=== App art ===
Snibbe created some of the first interactive art apps for iOS devices (iPhone, iPad, and iPod Touch). His first three apps—Gravilux, Bubble Harp, and Antograph—released in May, 2010 as iOS ports of screen-based artwork from the 1990s Dynamic Systems Series, all rose into the top ten in the iTunes Store's Entertainment section, and have been downloaded over a million times.

Snibbe collaborated with Björk to produce Biophilia, the first full-length app album, which was released for iPad and iPhone in 2011, as well as producing the visuals for her Biophilia tour. Other interactive song apps and app albums followed, including the Philip Glass: REWORK App based on the album produced by Beck, the METRIC: Synthetica App based on Metric's 2013 album, and the Passion Pit Gossamer App.

An interview with Snibbe about his work with Björk on Biophilia can be found in the 2013 BBC Documentary When Björk Met Attenborough.

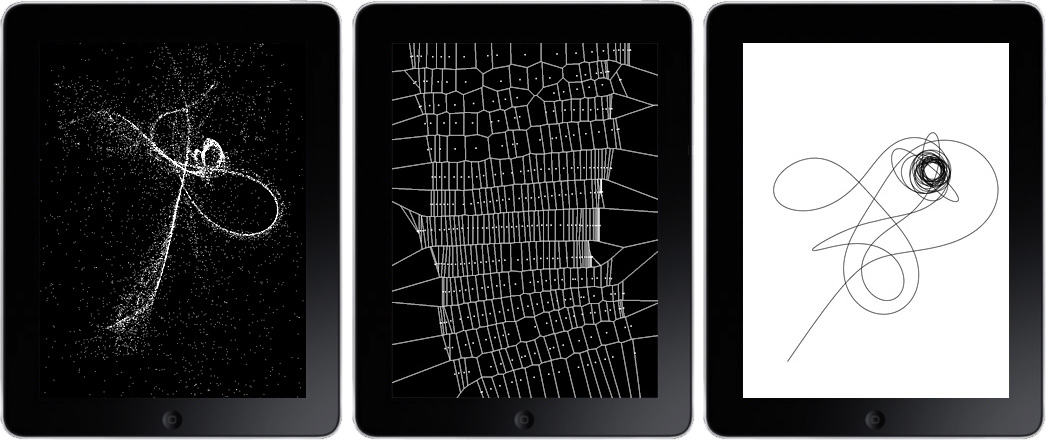
Gravilux, Bubble Harp, and Tripolar, 2010. Apps for iPad, iPhone, and iPod Touch by Scott Snibbe based on interactive artwork for the screen from 1997 to 2002

=== Teaching, education, and research ===
Snibbe has taught media art, animation, and computer science at UC Berkeley, NYU's Courant Institute of Mathematics, California Institute of the Arts, and the San Francisco Art Institute. He serves as an advisor to The Institute for the Future and The Sundance Institute.

Snibbe teaches mediation and leads meditation retreats, and trained in the Tibetan Buddhist tradition with teachers from The Foundation for the Preservation of the Mahayana Tradition (FPMT) including Geshe Ngawang Dakpa, the Dalai Lama, and Lama Zopa Rinpoche. In 2020 he launched the meditation podcast A Skeptic's Path to Enlightenment, that adapts the Tibetan Buddhist Lamrim and Mind Training techniques to a secular audience.

Snibbe received undergraduate and master's degrees in computer science and fine art from Brown University, where he studied with Dr. Andries van Dam and Dr. John Hughes. Snibbe studied animation at the Rhode Island School of Design with Amy Kravitz. After making several hand-drawn animated shorts, he turned to interactive art as his primary artistic medium.

At the CHI 2009 conference, Snibbe presented "Social Immersive Media," a research paper published via his nonprofit research organization Sona Research, coining the term Social Immersive Media to describe interface techniques immersive augmented reality interactive experiences focused on social interaction, and winning the best paper of conference award.

In November, 2013 Snibbe and Jaz Banga debated Laura Sydell and Christopher M. Kelty in an Oxford style debate entitled, Patent Pending: Does the U.S. Patent System stifle innovation?

=== Technology entrepreneur ===
Snibbe worked as a Computer Scientist at Adobe Systems from 1994 to 1996, on the special effects and animation software Adobe After Effects, named on six patents for work in animation, interface, and motion tracking. He was an employee at Paul Allen's Interval Research from 1996 to 2000 where he worked on computer vision, computer graphics, interactive music, and haptics research projects.

Snibbe was the founder of Snibbe Interactive (2007), which distributed and developed immersive interactive experiences for museums, entertainment and branding; Scott Snibbe Studio (2011) which produces original apps and apps made in collaboration with other musicians and filmmakers; and the nonprofit research organization Sona Research, which researched the socially beneficial applications of interactive technologies with grants from the National Science Foundation.

In 2013, Snibbe founded Eyegroove, a social network for creating and sharing short music videos on mobile phones. The app was a precursor to more popular services musical.ly and TikTok, and was acquired by Facebook in 2016. Post-Acquisition, Facebook integrated Eyegroove's real-time video effect technology into Instagram, Messenger, Facebook, and WhatsApp's new camera and visual sharing features released in 2017 to compete with Snapchat. Snibbe subsequently joined Facebook's Building 8 team, which was later renamed Portal after the group's first product release, and worked there until 2019 creating new augmented reality hardware and software products for the home.

=== Awards and grants ===
Snibbe has received several awards including the Webby Award and Prix Ars Electronica; and grants from the Rockefeller Foundation, The Ford Foundation, the National Endowment for the Arts, and The National Science Foundation.

== Notable artworks ==
Interactive Art for the Screen

- Motion Sketch, 1989
- Motion Phone, 1994
- Bubble Harp, 1997
- Gravilux, 1997
- Myrmegraph, 1998
- Emptiness is Form, 2000

iPhone and iPad Apps

- Gravilux, 2010
- Bubble Harp, 2010
- Antograph, 2010
- Tripolar, 2011
- OscilloScoop, 2011

Interactive Projections

- Boundary Functions, 1998
- Shadow, 2002
- Deep Walls, 2002
- Shy, 2003
- Impression, 2003
- Depletion, 2003
- Compliant, 2003
- Concentration, 2003
- Cause and Effect, 2004
- Visceral Cinema: Chien, 2005
- Shadow Bag, 2005
- Central Mosaic, 2005
- Outward Mosaic, 2006
- Make Like a Tree, 2006
- Falling Girl, 2008

Electromechanical Sculpture

- Mirror, 2001
- Circular Breathing, 2002
- Blow Up, 2005

How to Train a Happy Mind: A Skeptic's Path to Enlightenment by Scott Snibbe, published by Watkins Books (UK) Penguin Random House (US), 2024

Internet Art

- It's Out, 2001
- Tripolar, 2002
- Fuel, 2002
- Cabspotting, 2005

Public Art Installations

- You Are Here, New York Hall of Science, 2004
- Women Hold up Half the Sky, Mills College, 2007
- Transit, Los Angeles International Airport, 2009

Performance

- In the Grace of the World, Saint Luke's Orchestra, 2008

Film

- Lost Momentum, 1995
- Brothers, 1990
- When Björk Met Attenborough, 2013

Books

- How to Train a Happy Mind: A Skeptic's Path to Enlightenment. , ( March, 2024 )

== See also ==
- Interactive art
- Electronic art
- Computer art
- Software art
- Abstract film

== Sources ==
- Paul, Christiane (2003). Digital Art (World of Art series). London: Thames & Hudson. ISBN 0-500-20367-9.
- Wilson, Steve Information Arts: Intersections of Art, Science, and Technology ISBN 0-262-23209-X
- Bullivant, Lucy (2006). Responsive Environments: architecture, art and design (V&A Contemporaries). London:Victoria and Albert Museum. ISBN 1-85177-481-5.
- Fiona Whitton, Tom Leeser, Christiane Paul (2005). Visceral Cinema: Chien. Los Angeles: Telic. ASIN: B000BFHTOE.
- ''Better Living through Chemistry'', San Francisco Examiner, November 8, 2001.
- KQED TV documentary on Scott Snibbe, original airdate: April 2005
- Scott Snibbe Studio website
