= Interval Research Corporation =

- Type: Research think tank
- Industry: Research and Development
- Founded: 1992
- Defunct: 2000
- Fate: Dissolved
- Headquarters: Palo Alto, U.S.
- Key people: Paul Allen (Chairman); David Liddle (CEO, President)
- Number of employees: More than 110

Interval Research Corporation was founded in 1992 by Paul Allen and David Liddle. It was a Palo Alto laboratory and technology incubator focusing on consumer product applications and services with a focus on the Internet.

A 1997 version of the company's web page described itself as "a research setting seeking to define the issues, map out the concepts and create the technology that will be important in the future.... [pursuing] basic innovations in a number of early-stage technologies and [seeking] to foster industries around them – sparking opportunity for entrepreneurs and highlighting a new approach to research.".

A 1999 Wired magazine article based on a memo from Paul Allen described the company as under fire from Allen to produce "less R and more D." Interval Research Corporation officially closed its doors in April 2000, while a small group of former employees were kept on to form Interval Media to continue a few specific projects. Interval Media was closed in June, 2006.

== Former employees ==
During its brief existence, Interval employed many well-known computer technology pioneers and experts, including:

- Denise Caruso, technology journalist
- Franklin C. Crow, inventor of important anti-aliasing techniques
- Sally Cruikshank, filmmaker and animator
- Marc Davis, founder of Yahoo! Research Berkeley
- Trevor Darrell, faculty at University of California, Berkeley and co-inventor of Caffe
- Paul Debevec, computer graphics researcher
- Bruce Donald, geometer and animation researcher (computer graphics), co-inventor (with Tom Ngo) of Embedded Constraint Graphics
- Caterina Fake, co-founder of Flickr and Hunch
- Rolf Faste, Stanford design professor, who led the team that named the corporation "Interval Research"
- Lee Felsenstein, designer of the first mass-produced portable computer
- Paul Freiberger, Silicon Valley journalist
- Russell Ginns, game designer and author
- Don Hopkins, new-media artist, The Sims developer and pie menu interface designer
- Dan Ingalls, inventor of BitBLT and architect of several Smalltalk implementations
- Brenda Laurel, author, entrepreneur, virtual-reality artist
- Golan Levin, new-media artist
- Daniel Levitin, cognitive neuroscientist, best-selling author
- David Liddle, venture capitalist
- Max Mathews, acoustician, computer music pioneer
- Michael Naimark, new-media artist
- John R. Pierce, electrical engineer, pioneer in satellite telecommunication and a refiner of the original traveling wave tube
- Arati Prabhakar, Science and Technology Advisor to President Biden
- David P. Reed, inventor of TCP/IP
- Dean Radin, a parapsychologist
- Robert Shaw, physicist and chaos theory pioneer
- Dick Shoup, computer graphics pioneer
- Malcolm Slaney, research scientist at Google, IEEE Fellow
- Gillian Crampton Smith, founder of the Computer-Related Design program at the Royal College of Art in London, and the Interaction Design Institute Ivrea in Ivrea, Italy.
- Scott Snibbe, new-media artist
- Russell Targ, a physicist and parapsychologist
- Bill Verplank, interface designer of the Xerox Star, the first WIMP (computing) GUI
- Leo Villareal, installation artist and Burning Man board member
- Terry Winograd, emeritus professor of computer science at Stanford University
