= Marc Hijink =

- Born: 1969 (age 55–56); Netherlands
- Occupation: journalist
- Known for: tech columnist
- Notable work: Focus, the ASML Way book

Marc Hijink (born 1969) is a Dutch financial journalist and technology columnist, recognized for his comprehensive coverage of the semiconductor industry.

Hijink holds a master's degree in Communications and Journalism from Radboud University in Nijmegen. Since 2006, he has been a technology columnist for the Dutch daily newspaper NRC, with a particular focus on companies such as ASML and the role of Europe in global technological developments. Hijink's in-depth reporting culminated in a three-year project providing an insider's perspective on ASML, which resulted in the publication of his book Focus – The ASML Way. Prior to his work at NRC, he served as editor-in-chief for the Dutch editions of PC Magazine and ZDNet and worked as a reporter at De Gelderlander.
