= David Liddle =

American academic

David Liddle is co-founder of Interval Research Corporation, consulting professor of computer science at Stanford University. While at Xerox PARC he was credited with heading development of the Xerox Star computer system. In 1982 he co-founded Metaphor Computer Systems. He has served on the board of many corporations. He was chair of the board of trustees of the Santa Fe Institute from 1994 to 1999. Liddle holds a B.S. in computer science from the University of Michigan, and a Ph.D. in EECS from the University of Toledo, in Ohio.

In January 2012, he joined the board of directors of SRI International.
