= Joy Mountford =

S. Joy Mountford
- Born: S.Joy Mountford
- Education: University College London, University of Illinois at Urbana-Champaign
- Occupation: Senior Director
- Known for: Human Computer Interface

S. Joy Mountford is known for her work in the field of computer-human interaction and interface design. From 1986 to 1994, she was Head of the Human Interface Group at Apple Computer where she helped in developing QuickTime. In 2012, Mountford won the Lifetime Practice Award from SIGCHI and joined the CHI Academy.

== Education ==
Mountford received her Bachelor of Science in Cognitive Psychology from University College London, then received a scholarship to study Engineering Psychology at the University of Illinois. Her graduate work focused multi-modal models of information processing.

== Career ==
Mountford first joined Aviation at Honeywell Systems Research Center designing speech recognition systems, stereographic helmet displays, and automated flight controls for B52, RF4, and F-16/18. She continued Artificial Intelligence research efforts at Microelectronics Computer Consortium (MCC) in Austin, Texas as a project leader of the Visual Metaphors team.

Mountford moved to California to manage the Apple Human Interface Group. This team nurtured interdisciplinary teams of artists and scientists to practice user experience and design, initiating what is now referred to as 'Design Thinking'. At Apple her team became highly influential by teaching and training a new generation of designers through the International Design Expo program, which ran for over 20 years.

At Apple many of the team’s interface ideas were seminal, media-based and came to life in current Apple products. In 2020 ‘stacks’ was released as part of system software, which was based on the work performed in the Human Interface Group in 1992. Additional projects were SonicFinder, Transition Factory, Photologger, Quicktime VR, and Bubble Help in derivative forms. During her Apple tenure Mountford also completed a Management Business Program at INSEAD Business School.

Mountford was a senior project lead at Interval Research focusing on Soundscapes using both physical objects and software to compose non-notational audio scapes. In addition, her team built printable internet-aware books serving as new interactive experiences. Some of this work made its way into products of toy companies like Lego and Mattel, under her own company.

As a VP of User Experience Design at Yahoo!, her work focused on bringing data to use through data visualizations. These were installed as some of the first ever realtime 3D data visualisations on the building walls. Examples were real time travel of mail around the world, as well as live uploads of digital photos across the world from Flickr. Mountford was also a UX product leader of several Y! properties, including the data innovation team in San Francisco. After Yahoo!, Mountford worked for Akamai Technologies, the largest CDN. In 2012 she established both east and west User Experience and Design teams. In 2015, she became the Interface Practice Lead for the Advanced UX team at Ford Motor Company's Innovation and Research Center in Palo Alto, California, working in digital agency and sonic experiences.

Mountford has over 30 granted patents, most in the areas of visual and audio interface technology. She continues to consult to companies and give talks worldwide.

== Awards ==
In 2009, Mountford received an Osher Fellowship Award from the Exploratorium. In 2019, she received the Mission College Women Leadership award.
