= Copenhagen Institute of Interaction Design =

Coordinates: 55.6825°N 12.5932°E

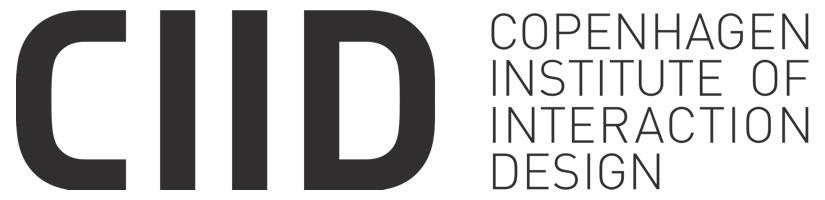
- Established: 2007
- Location: Bergamo, Italy
- Website: ciid.dk

The Copenhagen Institute of Interaction Design (CIID) is a postgraduate school and consultancy based in Bergamo, Italy and San Jose, Costa Rica, which focuses on the domain of interaction design.

== History ==
The Copenhagen Institute of Interaction Design was founded in 2006 and welcomed its first students in 2007, housed in studios on the Østerbro campus of Danmarks Designskole in northern Copenhagen and in 2008, completed its Pilot Year programme of a full-time Masters-level course in the field. The Pilot Year was awarded financial funding by The Enterprise and Construction Authority (EBST), the Danish Ministry of Culture, Novo Nordisk and the JL Foundation, and ran with the support of Design School Kolding.

== Description ==
The course is headed by Simona Maschi, and its board and faculty include people such as Gillian Crampton Smith and Bill Verplank. The business side of CIID undertakes consultancy and research in the fields of education, interaction design, product design and service design for global clients.

In 2024 CIID opened a studio in Bergamo, Italy, hosted at the recently renovated Monastero di Astino, an abbey first built in 1070AD, which serves as a base for the school's yearlong graduate program. In addition, CIID offers "pop-up" courses in Bergamo and from a location in San Jose, Costa Rica, as well as being hosted by a range of partner institutions such as FLAME University near Pune, India.
