= Hardware interface design =

Cross-disciplinary design field

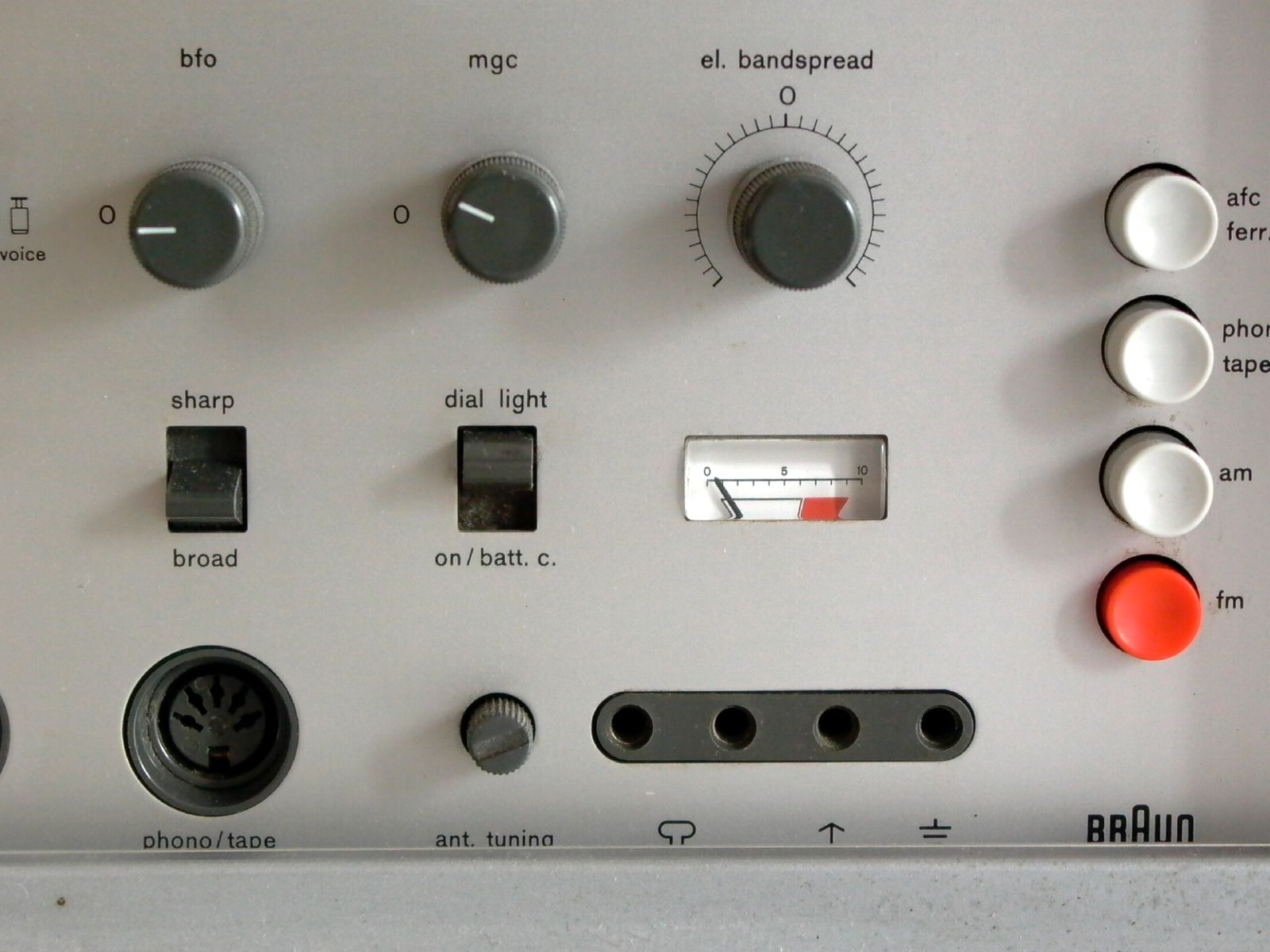
Dieter Rams, and by extension Braun, produced minimal yet tactile hardware interfaces for a variety of products such as this Braun T1000CD.

Hardware interface design (HID) is a cross-disciplinary design field that shapes the physical connection between people and technology in order to create new hardware interfaces that transform purely digital processes into analog methods of interaction. It employs a combination of filmmaking tools, software prototyping, and electronics breadboarding.

Through this parallel visualization and development, hardware interface designers are able to shape a cohesive vision alongside business and engineering that more deeply embeds design throughout every stage of the product. The development of hardware interfaces as a field continues to mature as more things connect to the internet.

Hardware interface designers draw upon industrial design, interaction design and electrical engineering. Interface elements include touchscreens, knobs, buttons, sliders and switches as well as input sensors such as microphones, cameras, and accelerometers.

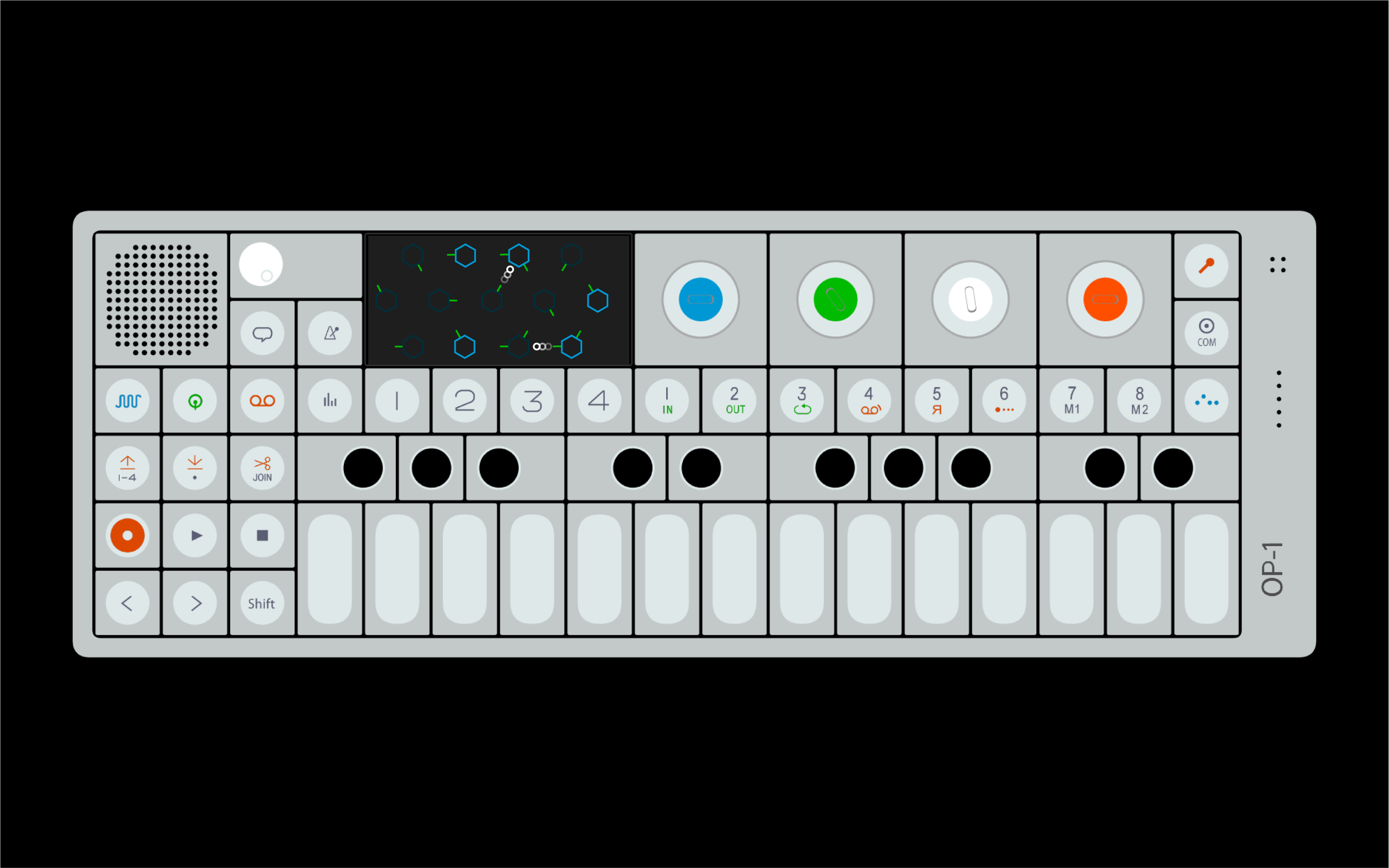
The Teenage Engineering OP-1 combines a mixture of hardware buttons, knobs, and a color-coded OLED display.

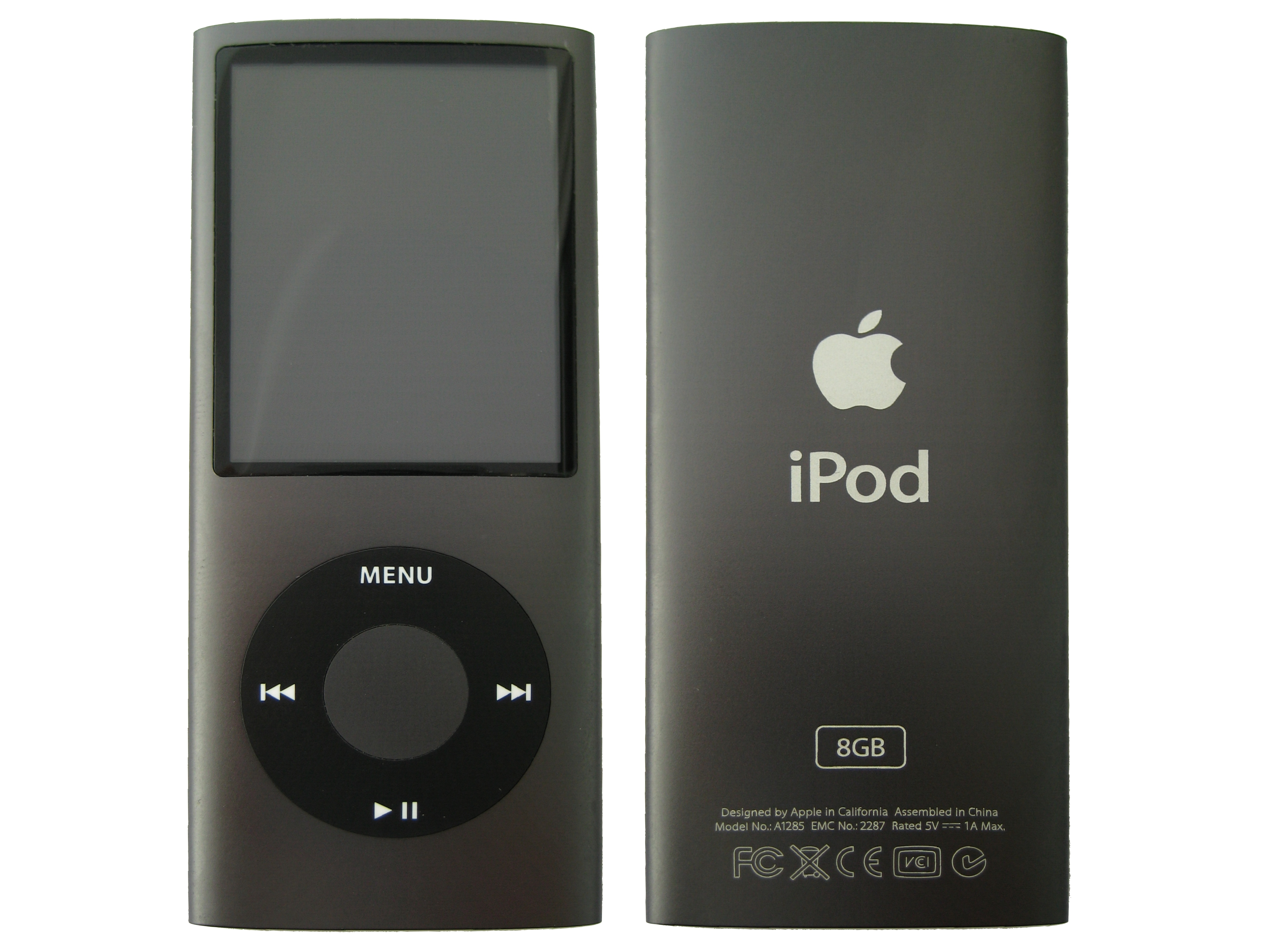
An iPod, a hardware interface that re-imagined the jog wheel

== History ==
In the last decade a trend had evolved in the area of human-machine-communication, taking the user experience from haptic, tactile and acoustic interfaces to a more digitally graphical approach. Important tasks that had been assigned to the industrial designers so far, had instead been moved into fields like UI and UX design and usability engineering. The creation of good user interaction was more a question of software than hardware. Things like having to push two buttons on the tape recorder to have them pop back out again and the cradle of some older telephones remain mechanical haptic relicts that have long found their digital nemesis and are waiting to disappear.

However, this excessive use of GUIs in today’s world has led to a worsening impairment of the human cognitive capabilities. Visual interfaces are at the maximum of their upgradability. Even though the resolution of new screens is constantly rising, you can see a change of direction away from the descriptive intuitive design to natural interface strategies, based on learnable habits (Google’s Material Design, Apple’s iOS flat design, Microsoft’s Metro Design Language). Several of the more important commands are not shown directly but can be accessed through dragging, holding and swiping across the screen; gestures which have to be learned once but feel very natural afterwards and are easy to remember.

In the area of controlling these systems, there is a need to move away from GUIs and instead find other means of interaction which use the full capabilities of all our senses. Hardware interface design solves this by taking physical forms and objects and connecting them with digital information to have the user control virtual data flow through grasping, moving and manipulating the used physical forms.

If you see the classic industrial hardware interface design as an “analog” method, it finds its digital counterpart in the HID approach. Instead of translating analog methods of control into a virtual form via a GUI, one can see the TUI as an approach to do the exact opposite: transmitting purely digital processes into analog methods of interaction.

== Examples ==
Example hardware interfaces include a computer mouse, TV remote control, kitchen timer, control panel for a nuclear power plant and an aircraft cockpit.

== See also ==
- Interaction design
- Interface design
- Industrial design
- Kinetic user interface
- User experience design
- User-centered design
- Tangible user interface
- Organic user interface
- Service design
- Usability
