= Gillian Crampton Smith =

British interaction designer

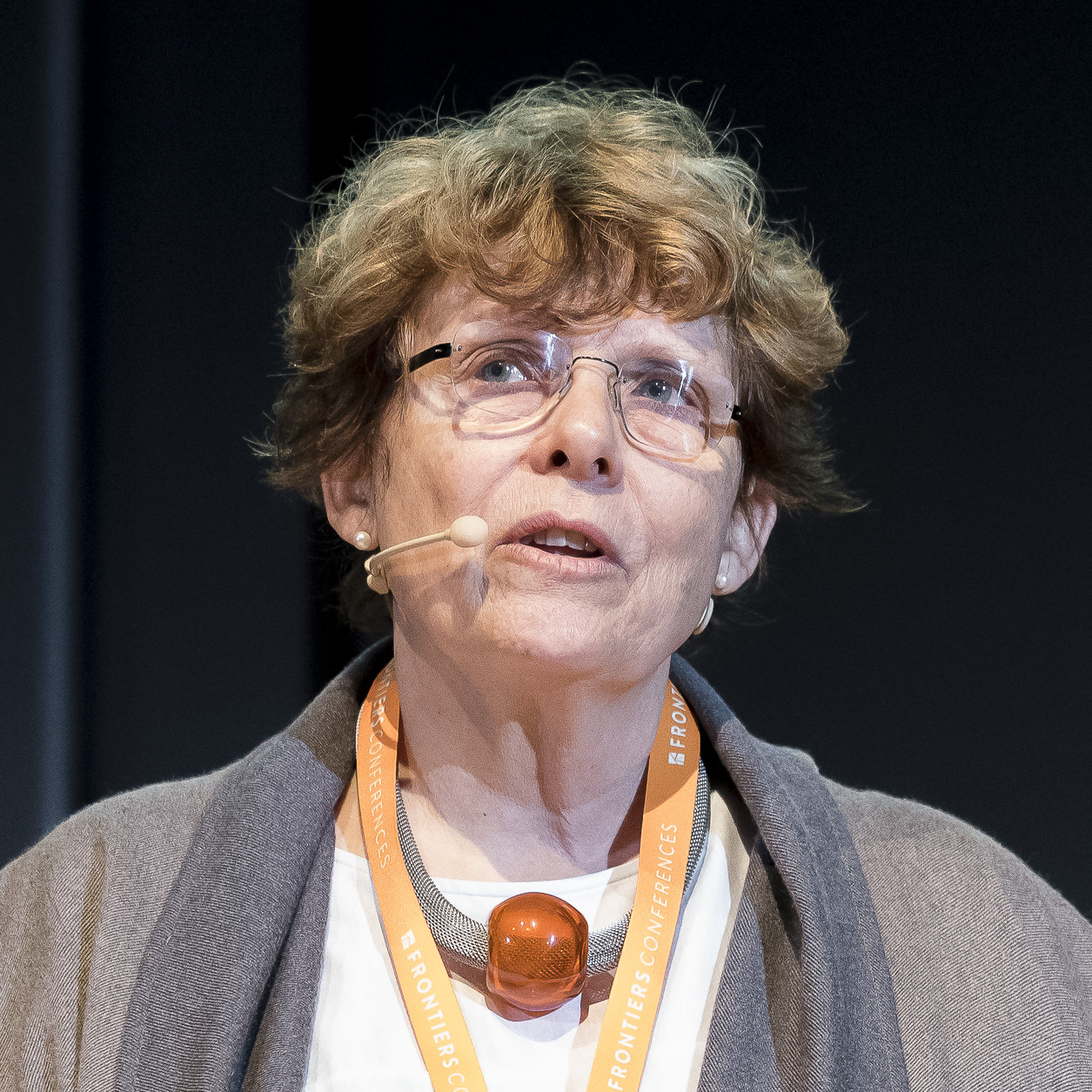
- Education: Cambridge University
- Scientific career
- Fields: Human-computer interaction, Interaction design
- Workplaces: Royal College of Art; Apple Computer; Interaction Design Institute Ivrea; Iuav University of Venice

Gillian Crampton Smith is a British educator, interaction designer, and a pioneer of computer desktop publishing. Since the early 1980s she has developed several academic graduate programs focused on digital graphic design, typesetting and human-computer interaction, notably at Saint Martin's School of Art, the Royal College of Art (1992-2000), Interaction Design Institute Ivrea (2000-2005) and Iuav University of Venice (2006–2014). She is an Honorary Professor at the University of Applied Sciences Potsdam, and an advisor at the MIT Senseable City Lab.

== Career ==
Crampton Smith studied philosophy and history at Cambridge University. Through the 1970s she worked in publishing for The Sunday Times and The Times Literary Supplement. In the early 1980s, she designed and developed a page-layout program for the Apple II computer, which convinced her of the potential of artists and designers in the creation of information technologies.

In the 1980s she started developing academic programs that focused on digital interactive design. In 1983 she joined Saint Martin's School of Art, where she set up a new postgraduate course in graphic design and computers for practicing designers. In 1989 she moved to the Royal College of Art where she built the Computer Related Design (CRD) program. The CRD program later achieved an international reputation as a leading centre for interaction design. In 2000 she founded and directed the Interaction Design Institute Ivrea in Italy. Faculty at the school invented Arduino to provide students with a low-cost way for students to create interactive physical prototypes. From 2006-2014 Crampton-Smith led the Interaction Design Programme at Iuav University of Venice.

== Publications ==
Crampton Smith has contributed essays and chapters to several books about software and interaction design and is the co-author of the book Theories and Practices in Interaction Design.

- Bagnara, Sebastiano, and Gillian Crampton Smith. Theories and Practice in Interaction Design. CRC Press, (2006.) ISBN 978-1-4822-6953-6
- Winograd, Terry. Bringing Design to Software. New York, N.Y., Acm Press; Reading, Mass, (1996.) ISBN 978-0-201-85491-6 Chapter titled "The Role of the Artist-Designer."
- Moggridge, Bill. Designing Interactions. Cambridge, Mass.; London, MIT Press, (2007.) ISBN 978-0-262-13474-3. Book foreword titled "What is Interaction Design."
- Maeda, John. Creative Code: Aesthetics + Computation. Thames & Hudson, (2004.) ISBN 978-0-500-28517-6. Chapter titled "Educating Interaction Designers."
- Dunne, Anthony. Hertzian Tales: Electronic Products, Aesthetic Experience, and Critical Design. MIT Press, (2006.) Wrote book Foreword. ISBN 978-0-262-54199-2
- Crampton Smith, Gillian. “Why It Took so Long: Developing the Design Mindset in the Technology Industries.” AIS Design Journal 4, no. 8 (October 2016): 16–28.

== Awards ==
Crampton Smith won the ACM SIGCHI 2014 Lifetime Achievement in Practice Award for outstanding contributions to the practice and understanding of human-computer interaction.
