= First-time user experience =

Initial stages of using a software program

In human–computer interaction and UI design, a first-time user experience (FTUE) refers to the initial stages of using a piece of software. It commonly includes configuration steps, such as signing up for an account. Every user of a service has their own FTUE, even if they have extensive experience with using a similar product. Patience, time investment, and intuitiveness are factors for a user's FTUE. Software services generally have different layouts, styles, graphics, and hotkeys which must be identified to contribute to a user's learning, mastery, and efficiency of the software. The FTUE is responsible for setting the stage for the experience of the user when interacting with a product down the line. This differs from the out-of-box experience (OOBE), which is specifically about packaging, information presentation, and setup of the system out of the box.

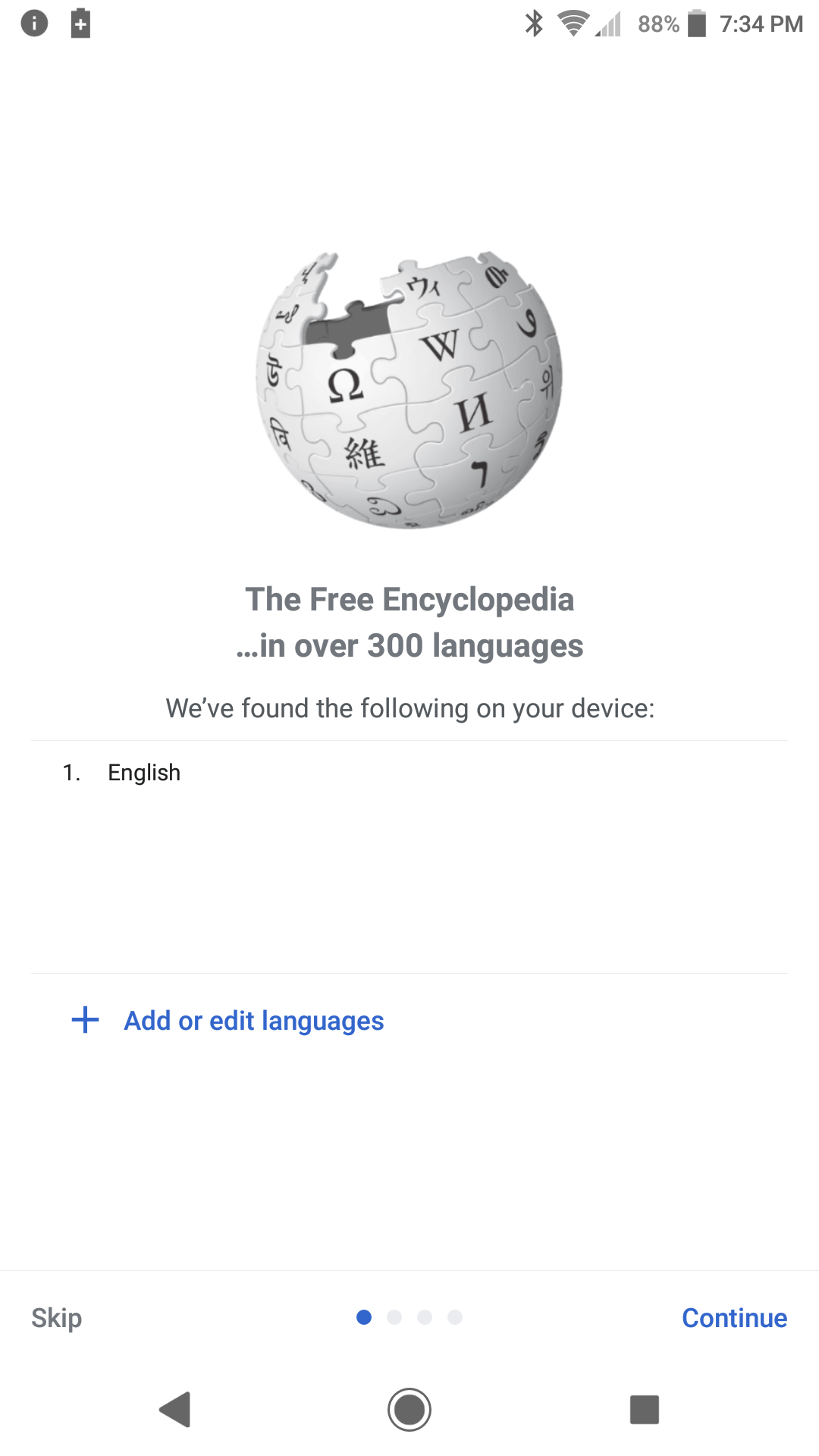
FTUE interface of the Wikipedia Android app. The screen will not appear on subsequent uses of the app unless the app data is cleared.

== Relation to the cold start problem ==
FTUEs are directly related to the well-known cold start problem in recommender systems, which attempts to balance the ease of the initial experience with the difficulty of gathering the needed information to make quality recommendations to the user. Generally, an effort is made to increase user retention by minimizing the barriers to entry while maximizing the quality of the recommendations for the user. For example, it was found that by changing the FTUE task from rating 15 individual items to rating a smaller number of groups of items, the time taken to complete the initial task was reduced by more than 50% and user satisfaction with the resulting recommendations increased.

However, there is evidence that steeper entry requirements can lead to more dedicated users. Furthermore, in a study at the University of Minnesota, it was found that increasing the barriers to entry can increase the amount of user-generated content produced during the FTUE without sacrificing the quality of the content. Users subjected to a more difficult FTUE may also be more likely to produce more content in the future. This comes at a tradeoff, as the user attrition rate gradually increases with a higher barrier to entry. In this light, the idea of the FTUE becomes one of maximizing the benefit to the online community and the quality of the recommendations while minimizing the increase in the rate of user attrition.

== User retention ==
Preventing customers from abandoning software after the initial exposure is a goal of good FTUE design. The following are examples of efforts in user retention.

- Speed vs Quality: First impressions on the initial user interface (UI) of an interactive application depend on multiple factors; most notably speed and quality. Speed and quality are not necessarily inversely related, but if there is a limit on the amount of development hours available for a project, one of the two will generally suffer. However, recent trends in digital entertainment indicate that high-fidelity visuals are often prioritized to ensure user retention and build trust within the first few seconds of interaction. Sacrifices in quality can include fewer luxury features, less intuitive/advanced UI features, or minimal customization. Sacrifices in speed can result in overall sluggish performance or delayed responsiveness when interacting with external clients or servers. Both are important to the "feel" of the application, and thus factor into the FTUE.
- Negative first time user experiences: Negative FTUEs can severely impact user retention. Negative experiences can be related to over-complicated initial registration procedures.
- Social login: This allows users to create an account based on pre-obtained information from social networking profiles such as Facebook. Popular applications such as Spotify, Quora, Pinterest and more offer this method of registration. Up to 92% of people have reported leaving websites permanently instead of recovering lost login information; social login can help combat this by converting monthly unique users to monthly active users. Social login also allows access to the user's friends or contacts. This offers up more opportunity personalization and potential virality considering up to 78% of people claim to have visited a website after seeing it mentioned on their social network, and that they heavily weigh their friends recommendations for purchases of products mentioned via social media.
- Structured setup: A set of clearly outlined steps to completion/registration is key for a successful FTUE. For example, Facebook registration clearly displays the number of steps remaining before the creation of a new profile is complete. This type of transparency is favorable because “uncertain, unexplained waits feel longer than known, finite waits.” The more structured and clear the remaining time and number of steps remaining are, the more likely a user will be patient enough to go through and complete all of the steps required to get through the FTUE.
- Paid upgrades: Offering an opportunity to purchase an upgrade in the FTUE process can be advantageous considering that new users tend to be more motivated or enthusiastic. They will thereby be more likely to become paying customers instead of freemium users. After spending the time to install software and register, a user has shown at least moderate dedication to the technology and may be invested enough to pay for an upgrade they had not originally considered. Dropbox does this by offering more storage for a dollar amount per month with a simple, non-invasive question. Vimeo offers a professional package, as is common with many online services.

== Prolonged user experience ==
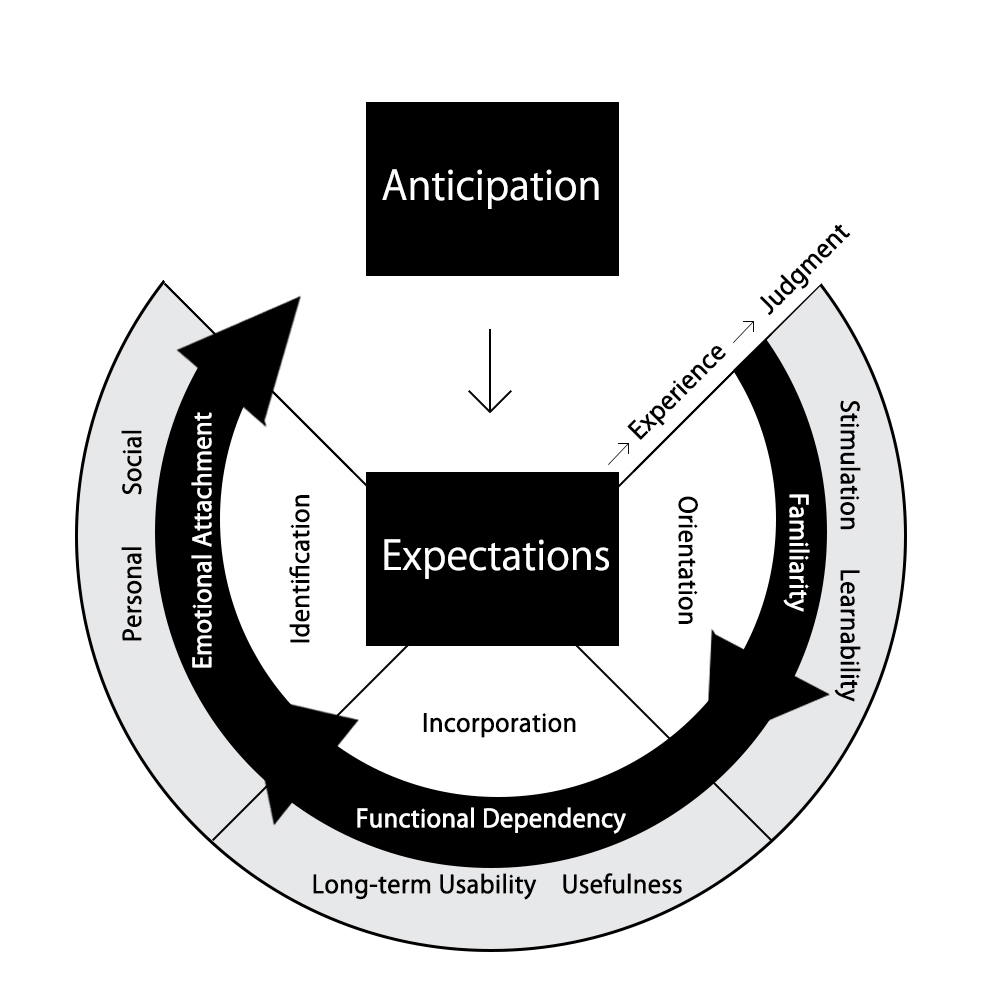
An illustration describing the temporality of experience for extended interaction with products.

While desired early experiences commonly seem to relate to pleasant sensational aspects of software and product use, prolonged experiences are significantly more tied to aspects that reflect how the product may become meaningful in the user's life. Social products are not solely responsible for mediating goal achievement; they fulfill an inner need for personal growth and communicating messages about the user's self-identity in a social setting. As a user's familiarity with a product strengthens over time, it is expected that they would experience less frustration, as well as less excitement. As a result, the perceived quality of the product is expected to change, and therefore the relative importance of different qualities in the product can also change over time. It is widely accepted that learnability and novelty are critical during initial phases of product use, however, other aspects such as a product's social capital are likely to motivate prolonged use.

The experience of a service or product's use is consistent of three main forces: familiarity, functional dependency, and emotional attachment. These three forces are responsible for shifting a users' experience across three phases: orientation, incorporation, and identification, respectively. The incorporation factor is the most significant user experience phase of the three. Incorporation makes long-term usability become much more important than the initial learnability, and the product's usefulness becomes the main factor impacting the product's overall value in the eye of the user. As the user accepts the product into their lives, it participates in normal social interactions, and integrates with part of the users self-identity that connects to others and creates a sense of community, building identification. The actual experience with the product has been found to be more influential to users' satisfaction than their prior expectations, though the act of anticipation and creation of expectations is a crucial part of the primary user experience. Sometimes anticipating experiences with a product becomes even more important, emotional, and memorable than the experiences itself.

Effective and successful services and products are designed for daily rituals and designed for the self. Users become attached to products that support a self-identity that they wish to communicate in certain settings. Products and self-identity have been a major part of consumer behavior research, but still remain largely unexplored in CHI and design research.

== See also ==
- Chief experience officer (CXO)
- Content strategy
- Contextual Inquiry
- Customer experience
- Expectation
- Human factors
- Interaction design
- Out-of-box experience
- User experience
- User-centered design
- User experience design
- User experience evaluation
- User research
