= Video game writing =

Creation of narrative for video games

Video game writing is the art and craft of writing scripts and narratives for video games. Similar to screenwriting, it is typically a freelance profession. It includes many differences from writing for film, due to the non-linear and interactive nature of most video games, and the necessity to work closely with video game designers and voice actors. There are many differing types of text in video games in comparison to stage shows or movies, including written text, foreign or made-up languages, and often situation-based information. Especially when developing Triple A games, more than one writer will be required to create the game, split into different roles.

== Writers ==
People who write video games are part of the design team, during pre-production, and create the main plot of a video game but can also focus on the dialogue, the character creation and development or the worldbuilding.

During the game development process, the design may change, and a video game writer can also be asked to fix the eventual narrative issues.

The importance of the plot can be minimized by some video game designers, for instance Harvey Smith of Arkane Studios claimed that "The world is very important. The characters are very important. The plot? It can be thrown away. Because each gamer will build his own story." Moreover, according to academic and video game designer Ian Bogost video games can be much more than narrative media, by putting together, in a non-linear structure, elements of everyday life, as in What Remains of Edith Finch.

One issue specific to the medium is that priority is given to interactive play mechanics over narrative which could lead to ludonarrative dissonance: a situation when ludic and narrative elements are opposed to each other, as Far Cry 2 director Clint Hocking defined the concept in his blog.

There is no specific training to video game writing and some video game writers – such as Tim Schafer and Sam Barlow – are also in charge of other game development tasks.

== Types ==
Video game writing differs from writing for other arts, due to the non-linear and interactive nature of most video games, and the necessity to work closely with video game designers and voice actors. There are many differing types of text in video games in comparison to stage shows or movies, including written text, foreign or made-up languages, and often situation-based information. Subsequently, more than one writer will often be used to create the game, split into different roles, with more specific job titles that can range from being a traditional writer, developing an overview of the story and how it reacts to the player, or creating a translation or localization.

=== Pitch writing ===
A pitch writer specializes in writing pitches for video games to publishers. They create collaborative pitch documents within a game studio that often contain design mockups or art concepts. The main parts of a pitch document, in order from first to last, are the executive summary, audience analysis, story, competition analysis, market analysis, gameplay, and budget and schedule.

With an increasing emphasis placed on game profitability, especially in the free to play model, the F.T.U.E. (First Time User Experience) and retention metrics have also become important parts of the pitch document.

=== Narrative design ===
Narrative designer is a hybrid role of video game design and writing that creates not only the story, but also how it is communicated to players and how the game mechanics work to reinforce that story. Bioware writer David Gaider described the role as "the person who shapes the game's narrative, as well as the one who writes all the words."

=== Script work ===
==== Script writing ====
The script writer focuses on the dialogue said by characters and the voice over. The script's dialogue can be written in flowcharts to illustrate the various dialogue resulting from both decision and indecision. Generally, a script writer is less involved with the video game's mechanics, and is tasked with writing and working with voice actors.

==== Script doctoring ====
Similarly, to screenplay script doctors, video game writers can be brought in to assist with writing-related tasks. However, the term is vaguer than in screenplays due to the wide variety of potential tasks needed.

== Industry practice ==
Similar to screenwriting, it is typically a freelance profession. Writing roles may also be filled by other members of the development team.

== Tools ==
Traditionally, game writers used simple tools like Word, Excel or just plain pen and paper. Some game writers also used tools initially designed for the film industry such as Final Draft. As the field has evolved and player agency started to play a bigger role, the need for professional game writing tools has emerged.

== See also ==
- Visual novel
- Narrative of video games, an overview of the historical importance and reception of game narratives
