= Think Company =

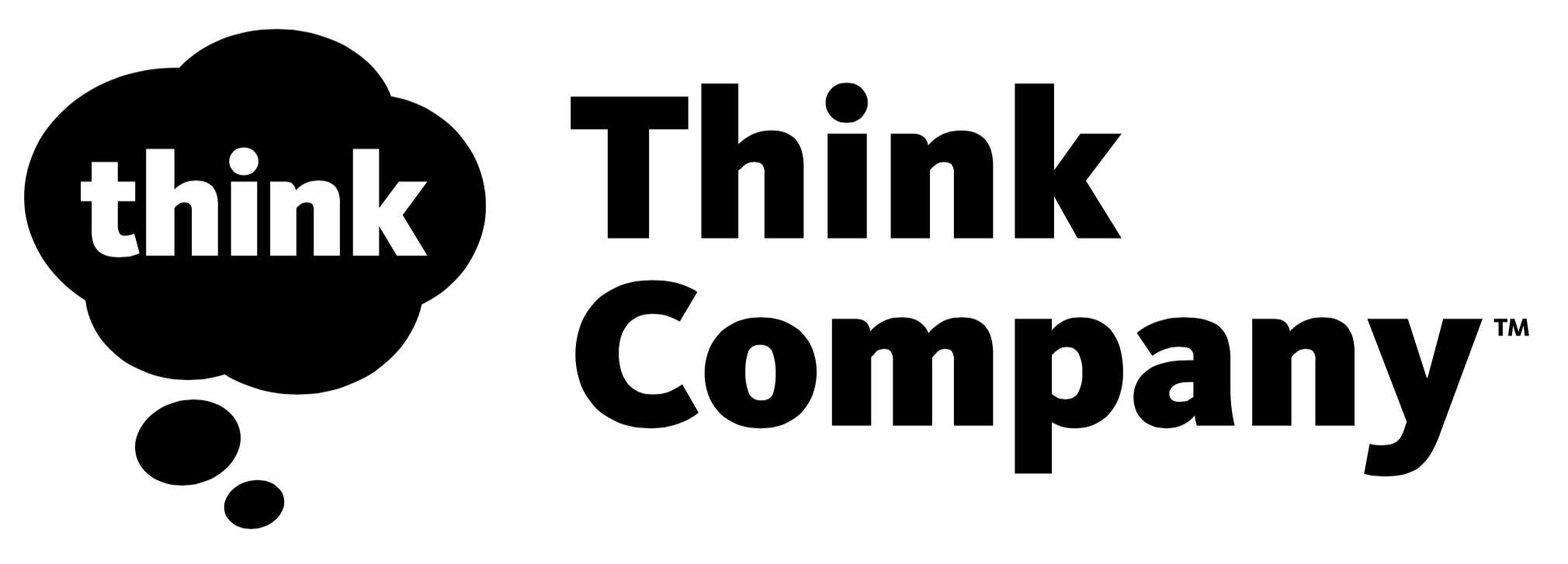
- Type: Private company
- Industry: Experience design, Digital transformation
- Founded: 2007
- Founders: Brian McIntire; Carl White
- Headquarters: Conshohocken, Pennsylvania United States
- Area served: Worldwide
- Website: thinkcompany.com

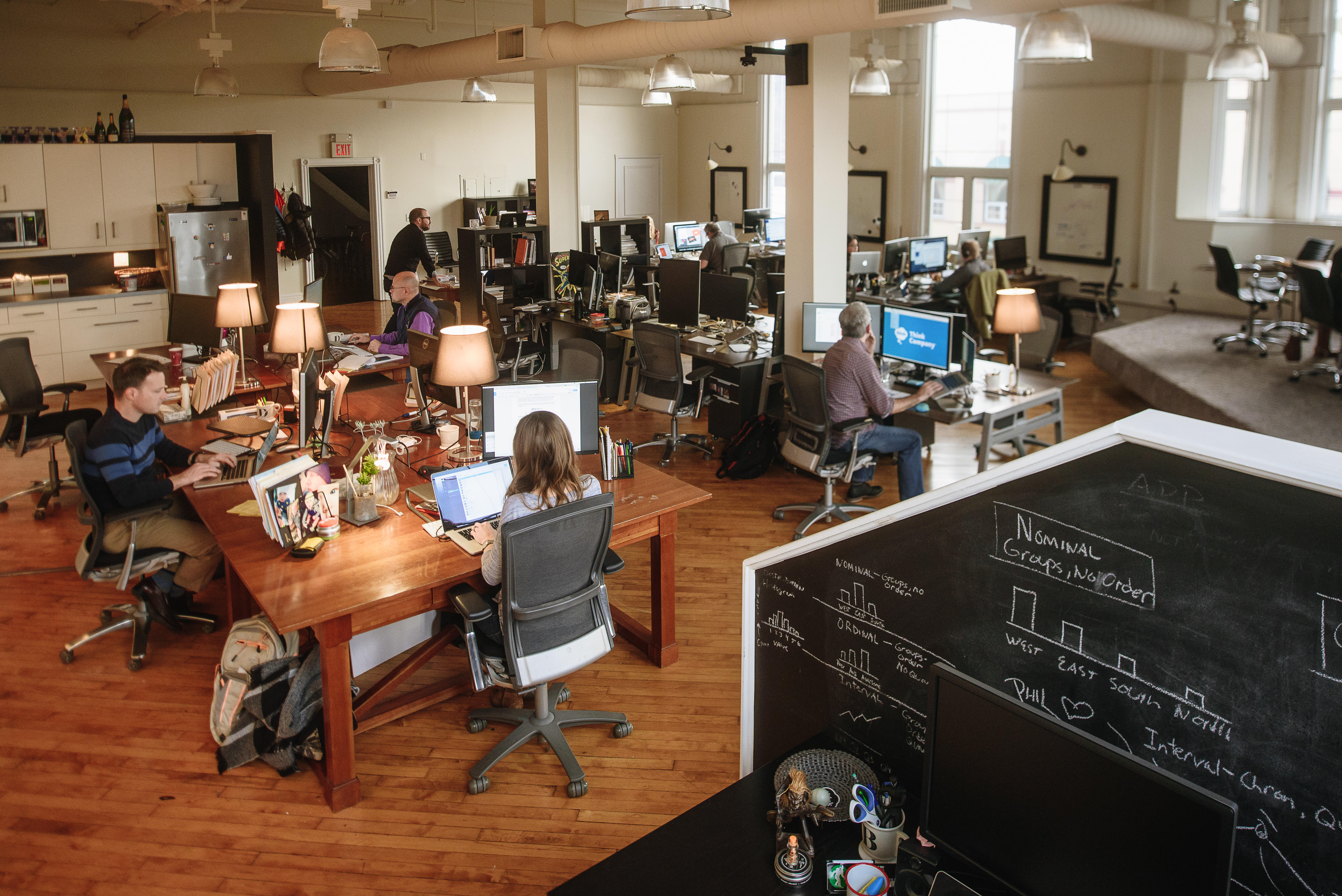
Conshohocken Studio

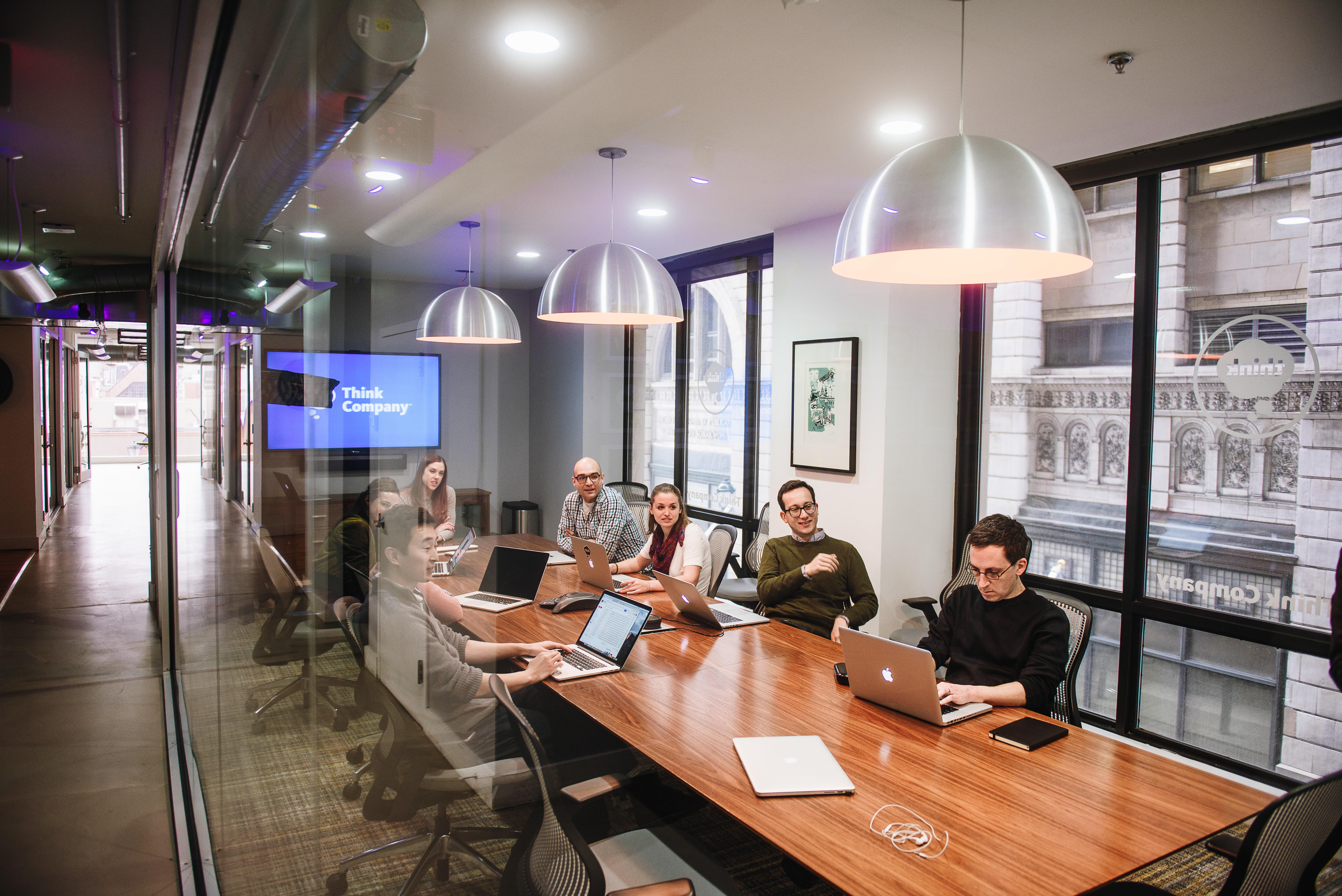
Philadelphia Studio

Think Company (formerly Think Brownstone) is an experience design and software development firm. Founded in 2007, Think Company has offices in Center City, Philadelphia and Conshohocken, Pennsylvania.

The company specializes in research; the design and development of websites and digital products, including UX, UI and experience; strategy, including digital strategy and content strategy; and software development.

Think Company is hired primarily by large, enterprise clients, but also by well-funded startups and nonprofits.

Ten years after partners Brian McIntire and Carl White founded Think Brownstone in Conshohocken, they changed the company's name to Think Company, saying that it “reflected their growth and focuses in on the most catching and relevant part of their name—think."

== Awards ==
Clutch named Think Company Pennsylvania's Top Consultancy for Enterprise App Modernization in 2021.

Think Company was on the Inc. 5000 list of the fastest-growing privately held U.S. companies in 2012 and from 2014 to 2020.

Think Company was listed as one of The Philadelphia 100 by the Wharton Small Business Development Center, The Entrepreneurs' Forum of Greater Philadelphia, and the Philadelphia Business Journal In 2011, 2012, and from 2014 to 2019.

In 2018, Think Company was named one of 25 Small Giants by Forbes.

The Philadelphia Inquirer named Think Company a Top Workplace from 2016 to 2020. The Philadelphia Business Journal named Think Company a Best Place to Work from 2015 to 2017.

In 2017, the Philadelphia Business Journal named Think Company one of the Soaring 76.
