= NakeyJakey =

American YouTuber (born 1994)

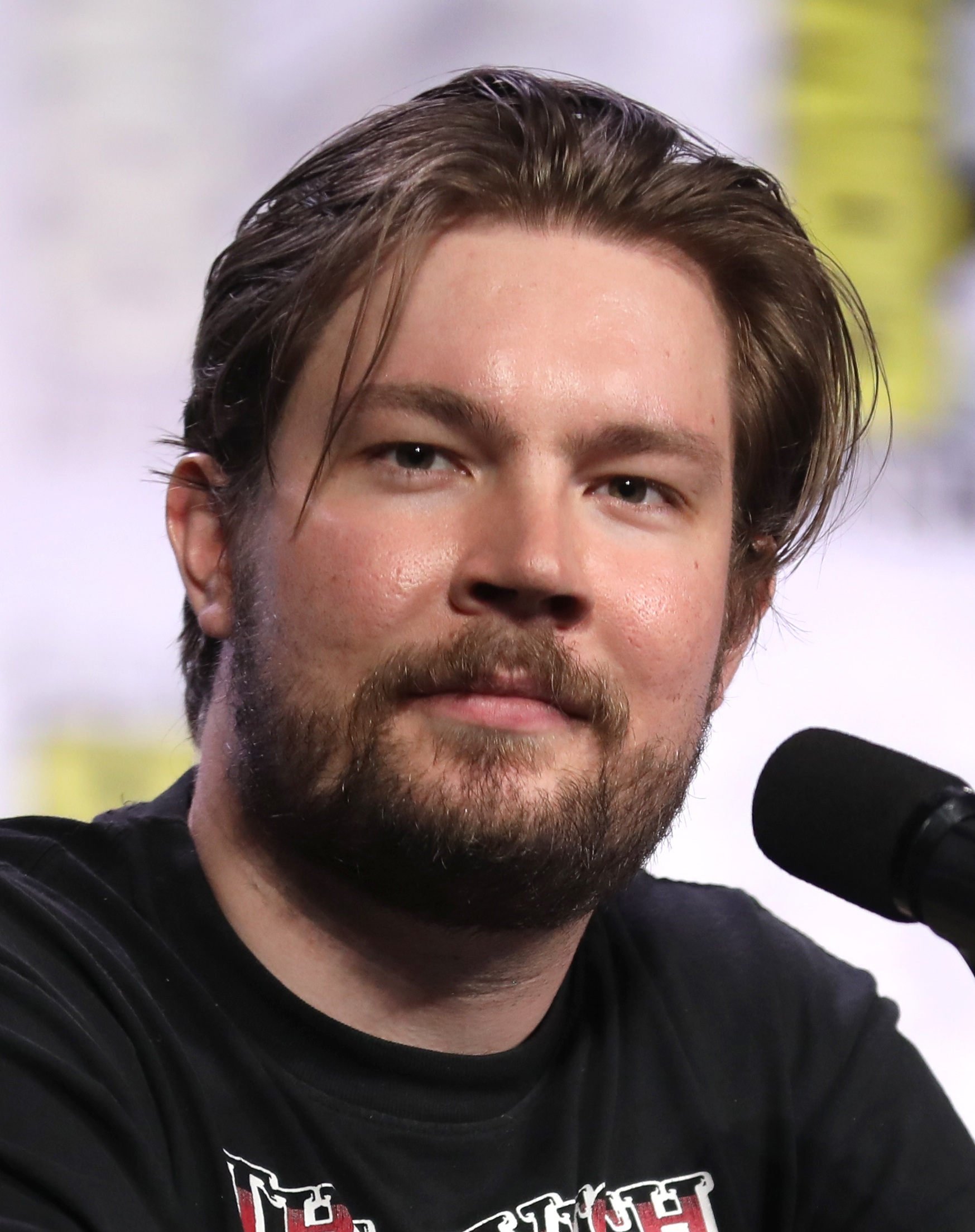
- Christensen in 2023
- Born: Jacob Matthew Christensen; December 28, 1994 (age 31); Hot Springs, South Dakota, US
- Occupations: YouTuber; musician
- Years active: 2015–present

YouTube information
- Channel: NakeyJakey
- Years active: 2015–present
- Genre: Video essay
- Subscribers: 2.12 million
- Views: 246 million
- Last updated: November 4, 2026

Jacob Matthew Christensen (born December 28, 1994), known online as NakeyJakey and Jakey, is an American YouTuber and musician.

== Life and career ==
Jacob Matthew Christensen was born on December 28, 1994. He grew up in Hot Springs, South Dakota. Christensen dropped out of college after a week of attending to pursue a music career. While living in Denver in 2015, Christensen played Dark Souls for the first time which inspired him to start his YouTube career.

Christensen's first project were a series of videos titled Games That Should Bang, highlighting elements from two different video games that Christensen argues combined would create a better game experience, such as combining Grand Theft Auto V's open world and Metal Gear Solid V: The Phantom Pain's in-game missions. Later, Christensen would release longer video essays critiquing video games and their developers, usually including Outdated in the title. Christensen's Outdated series includes "Rockstar's Game Design is Outdated", a critique on Red Dead Redemption 2's open-world exploration and "Naughty Dog's Game Design is Outdated", a critique of The Last of Us Part II's ludonarrative dissonance and linearity. Christensen has also released video essays on various topics such as Scholastic book fairs and Disney Channel Original Movies.

Christensen's first foray into music came with the release of a series of Rap Reviews videos, mixing original songs with reviews of video games. Christensen would release his own singles under a shortened name "Jakey", including "Moby Dick" in 2017 and "Not Dead Yet" in 2019. Christensen released "Pine Barrens" and "DRIVE OFF A BRIDGE" as singles for his debut album ROMCOM released in 2022. Mitch Worden of Sputnikmusic described ROMCOM as "a playful, emotional, uneven, sarcastic, honest, and despairing experience lathered in emo rap clichés and consequential production shenanigans."

== Discography ==
=== Albums ===
- ROMCOM (2022)

=== Singles ===
- "Cafeteria" (2016)
- "South Dakota" (2017)
- "Saintlike" (2017)
- "Medium" (2017)
- "Moby Dick" (2017)
- "Not Dead Yet" (2019)
- "Pine Barrens" (2021)
- "DRIVE OFF A BRIDGE" (2022)
