= Visual guide =

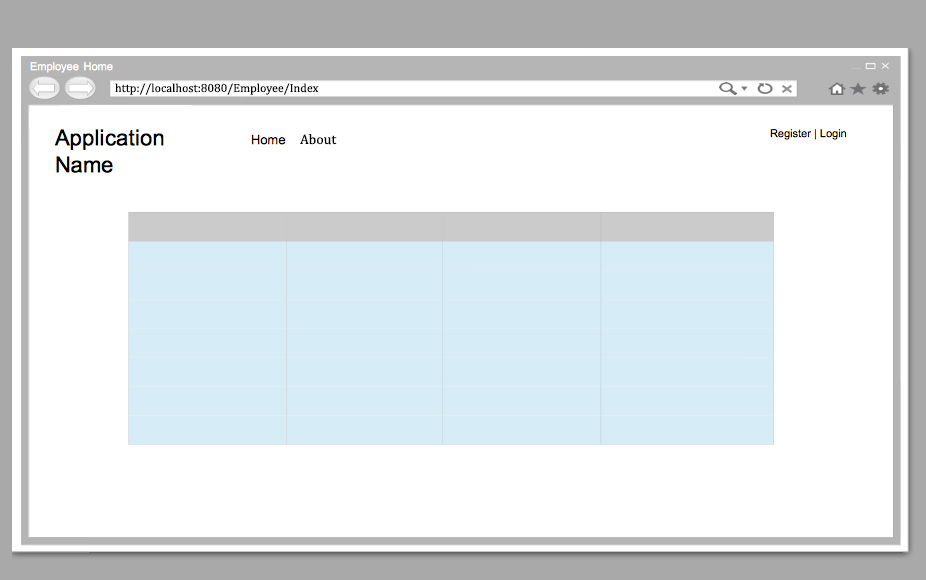
This is a basic wireframe. It includes the URL, title, links, graphics, and other elements of a webpage.

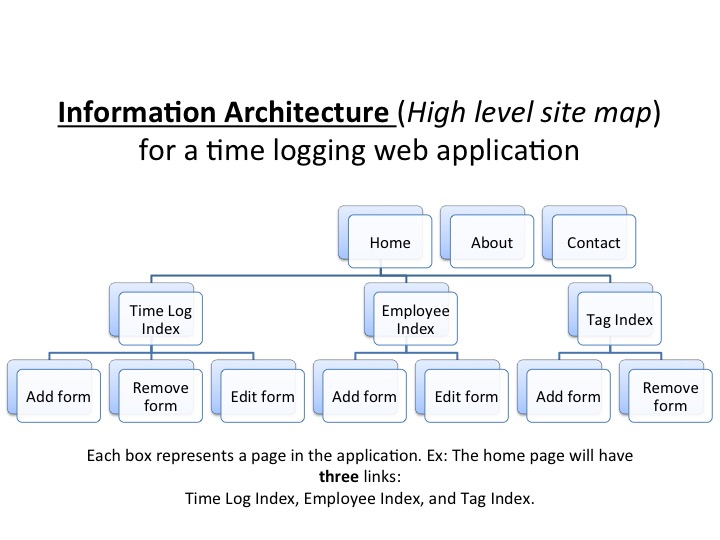
This is an example of information architecture relating to a web application.

When applied to building block a website or similar work product, a Visual Guide can be an intermediate step toward the end goal of a complete website. By creating a visual guide along the way, the designer, or developer can get input from the other people involved on the website such as the customer, their manager, and other members of the team. The visual guide will provide a view to the customer of what their website or project will end up looking like. It ensures that they are kept up to date on any developments and changes made to the structure or visuals. Visual guides also allow you to define the information hierarchy of the design.

A visual guide could be a wireframe, creative composition, or information architecture. A device that enables collaboration will lessen the chance of work having to be completely redone. A manager could create a visual guide for the team to complete the build-out.

Paper prototype could be an excellent way to develop Visual Guides.
