= Justinmind =

Prototyping tool

Justinmind prototyping tool
- Developer: Justinmind
- Stable release: 10.5 / July 16, 2024; 22 months ago
- Operating system: Microsoft Windows, Mac OS
- Available in: English
- License: Proprietary
- Website: www.justinmind.com

Justinmind is a prototyping and wireframing tool for the creation of prototypes of web and mobile apps. It’s known for its ability to simulate the appearance and functionality of a finished product as well as offering collaboration, interaction and design features. Overall, it has grown into one of the most popular prototyping tools in the industry.

Software prototypes and wireframes created with Justinmind can be shared on the cloud and simulated with mobile devices. The prototyping tool also generates HTML for entire prototypes.

== Features and capabilities ==
The program creates high-fidelity prototypes, a step before the first version of a mobile app or website is coded. The prototype can be used for showreels and testing purposes. Justinmind can be used to simulate webs and mobile apps without any coding, thus allowing non-programmers to be involved in the project.

- UI Design: the prototyping tool allows designers to create interfaces with a drag and drop system. Justinmind has several UI Kits pre-installed with the option of importing brand new ones.
- Web interaction design: with a range of triggers and actions, Justinmind allows users to add interactions to prototypes from basic microinteractions to more complex animations.
- Mobile app gestures design: mobile app prototypes can have interactions according to real hand gestures that can be later on tested via the Justinmind app. Designers can also create any mobile app while using device emulators.
- Forms design: forms can be made fully interactive and use real data for realistic simulation of the product.
- Data visualization in grids and tables: the tool makes it possible to import data into the prototype and visualize it in grids or tables. The data can be stored and used in different ways, in different screens.
- Share and get feedback: prototypes can be made public and shared with a URL. Designers can invite reviewers and developers in, leave comments and manage their users.
- Developer handoff: Justinmind has the ability to invite developers and have them review prototypes in a “developer mode” where the specifications and technical details are made clear and assets are retrievable.
- User testing: Justinmind can be integrated with various user testing tools like Hotjar, UserTesting, UserZoom, CrazyEgg, Validately and Clicktale.
- The Justinmind mobile app: once prototypes are shared on the cloud, they become accessible via the mobile app. This makes it possible to experience and test the prototypes on a real device.
- The app allows for code-free designing for extended reality as the result of an EU research grant.

== Awards ==
In 2020, Justinmind won the prize for Best Internal Collaboration tool for design at Products that Count. The tool won first prize by being most voted by thousands of Product Managers.

In 2012, Justinmind was awarded with the Best Application Award at the EclipseCon 2012

In 2011, Justinmind was awarded the second prize of the Eclipse Community Award at the EclipseCon 2011 in Santa Fe, California. That same year it also won the European Red Herring Top 100 Award, recognizing them as a leading private startup company.

It has been nominated for the Epsilon Award 2010. Later it won the fifth place of the award.
