= User advocacy =

User advocacy is a user experience design principle concerned with representing user perspectives in product design. One definition states that user advocacy is the practice of using designated spokespeople to facilitate interaction between users and designers of the products they use. Another more broadly defines user advocacy as the practice of advocating for the user, regardless of whether one is a user, designer, developer, researcher, manager, etc. User advocates typically may suspend their own personal or functional point of view, and attempt to see the product through the eyes of, and the experience of, the user of that product. The ability to take on the user's point of view, without personal judgement or bias, allows the advocate to see things as the user might see them, enabling them to ultimately make observations and perhaps recommendations to improve the user experience. Similarly, some user advocates will take a neutral, scientific point of view, and will observe and collect data from users that will suggest that the product or user experience could be changed or improved in a way that users would prefer or benefit from. User advocates may be scientists or engineers who use the scientific method to make improvements that result in increased ease of use, time savings, improved levels of user satisfaction, or other user-centered metrics.

An advocate is a person who argues for or supports a cause or policy.

A user advocate could either be a person, as in a research study; a persona, fictional characters that represent a typical customer or segment of the customer base; or a community, such as participants of a public discussion board.

== Origins ==
The idea of user advocates originated from large-scale software development projects. In such teams, a consensus is reached regarding the roles of a product designer (or systems designer) and the user experience (UX) analyst, that the two roles (designer and UX analyst) can no longer be effectively performed by the same individual(s) due to inherent conflicting interests. An example of such a conflict of interest would be a designer having to defend his own design decision about a product improvement, versus an alternative decision that could lead to a better user experience, but would negate the designer's original decision about how to improve the product.

Designer interaction with actual users on such large-scale projects would often be viewed as expensive and inefficient for some designers, but an alternative view suggests that some designers and some companies do not value interaction with actual users. Some experts have suggested that designers and developers may even have contempt for actual users. In large-scale projects there is often a practical necessity for the division of labor, but that should not be used to justify lack of user involvement at each step of the software development life cycle. The person responsible for designing a product may be far removed from the development of a product, and even further removed from traditional user experience studies, which analyze how users interact with a product versus how it was designed to be used. The degrees of separation inherent in these large-scale projects can create a disconnect between ambitious designers who risk creating ineffective products that they prefer to design, instead of designing what users want and need. Care must be taken to involve the user at each step of the design cycle, lest the needs of the user be ignored and a sub-standard product design result.

The idea of a consultant with expertise working with a client group has theoretical origins in models of process consulting, which focus on developing close relationships to work out joint solutions.

== Developing user personas for the purpose of user advocacy ==
One practice of user advocacy asks designers to define their users collectively, as one person or a persona, and attach common attributes and characteristics of their typical users, taking into consideration many types of use case scenarios users typically encounter to aid with anticipating the needs and expectations of a user. From this persona and its associated traits, tendencies, use case scenarios, functional requirements and user expectations can be derived and provide refined specifications for product improvements to be developed.

Such a practice essentially channels access product designers to users by representing their needs in the form a persona or fictional character.

== In technical communication ==
Technical communicators act as user advocates in the design of information products. They mediate between subject-matter experts and users through user personas, usability testing, and user-centered design. Technical communicators advocate for users based on three standards for product design:

- Usable – Designs are intuitive, safe, and easy to use
- Useful – Designs address user needs as determined by usability testing and user personas
- Compelling – Designs appeal to users, promoting use of the product

Risk communication is a user advocacy subfield centered on communicating and mitigating risks in products and environments.

== Benefits ==
User advocacy also helps make the effects of design decisions easier to measure because the traits and characteristics of user personas often consist of crowdsourced suggestions from actual users. Suggestions for improvement are generalized and prioritized according to frequency, severity, or an alignment with corporate initiatives. As a result, design decisions become less about a designer and more about fulfilling the needs of users, as the suggestions for improvement are typically provided directly by the users themselves.
