= Passin Miami =

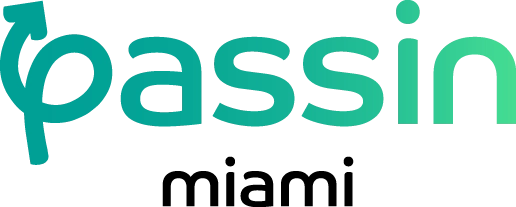
- Company type: Private
- Industry: Tourism / Travel
- Founded: 2020
- Headquarters: Miami, Florida, United States
- Area served: Miami metropolitan area
- Owner: Passin / Nockta
- Website: passinmiami.com

Passin Miami is a digital city pass designed to provide access to selected tourist attractions in Miami, Florida. The system operates entirely via mobile devices and allows visitors to enter participating venues using a QR code. It is intended as a digital alternative to traditional paper or plastic city passes, targeting both domestic and international tourists.

== History ==
Passin Miami was launched in 2020 as a response to increasing demand for mobile-first solutions in the tourism industry. The pass was developed to modernize the visitor experience by replacing physical tickets with a flexible, app-based system.

== Features ==
Passin Miami enables entry to partner attractions through QR codes activated on a user’s smartphone. Some versions of the pass include mobile data access via eSIM, catering particularly to international travelers. Users can select time-based options—such as 24 or 48 hours of access—and activate the pass at their convenience.

According to Marriott Bonvoy’s Tours & Activities platform, Passin Miami grants access to over 30 attractions, offers a free eSIM with up to 5 GB of mobile data, and includes a one-way airport transfer from Miami International Airport, all as part of the pass.

== UX redesign and strategic partnership ==
In April 2025, Passin Miami partnered with UX agency Nockta to upgrade its app and booking platform, yielding improved navigation and user engagement. According to a Newsfile (via DesignRush) press release, the collaboration focused on streamlining app navigation, clarifying pricing and itinerary workflows, and enhancing the checkout process.
