= Storytelling in video games =

Overview of narrative's importance to video games

In the early days of video gaming, narrative elements were minimal due to technological constraints. Games like Pong (1972) focused solely on gameplay mechanics without storytelling components. As technology advanced, developers began incorporating narratives to enhance player engagement. Text-based adventures such as Colossal Cave Adventure (1976) and Zork (1980) introduced simple fantasy narratives, laying the groundwork for storytelling in games. The evolution continued with titles like Half-Life (1998), which integrated storytelling seamlessly into gameplay without relying on traditional cutscenes, setting new standards for narrative in video games.

== Overview ==
Stories in video games are delivered in a myriad of ways. While it is most common to deliver exposition through cutscenes, games have also delivered their stories through environmental storytelling, such as in Bioshock. It is also common to deliver narrative through other means, such as via in-game text entries presented as journal entries or correspondences, or in audio recordings. Narratives do not even need to be given through spoken or written word; the game Inside tells its narrative through the scenery and events the player experiences as they progress through the game without any form of language.

Narratives in games are of varying significance to the experience; while an increasing number of game stories are intended as the main focus, simple stories that are only intended to serve as a justification for the gameplay have been a common approach. Certain genres, such as adventure games and their various sub-genres, have narrative as an essential element, while others, such as real-time strategy, do not require detailed stories as a feature.

Some games feature a "story mode" (sometimes also called "narrative mode"), a mode that is designed to focus on the story. The application and use of the term varies; it is sometimes used to discern from other modes of gameplay that do not feature story as a significant element, such as its use to distinguish from the online multiplayer mode of Grand Theft Auto V, or as an alternative difficulty setting which is intended to allow players to enjoy the narrative of a video game without encountering significant difficulty that may hinder their progression.

== History ==
Video games were first popularized with Pong. Pong was a simple virtual game of tennis in which, developer Nolan Bushnell said, the primary goal was "fun." According to Bushnell, games in that era had been so technologically challenging to produce that "it was exhausting to get the game to play without worrying about story" and as such, story was not a concern for many developers. Text adventure games such as Colossal Cave Adventure and Zork featured simple fantasy narratives which have been compared to Dungeons & Dragons.

In later years, technological advances allowed developers greater options for expressing story in a video game, which led to more expansive and ambitious narratives. Half-Life, released in 1998, made significant innovations in how it presented its narrative, such as its choice to tell its narrative without the use of cutscene cinematics or breaking up its world into levels, and is often credited with having codified many modern storytelling conventions within the medium.

== Criticism ==
While video game stories have received praise, it has also been argued that video games are not an ideal medium for storytelling, and that the overall quality of narratives within video games is not equal to those in other forms. Writing for The Atlantic, Ian Bogost criticizes the environmental storytelling approach to narrative used in first-person games with an exploration focus, such as BioShock, Gone Home, and What Remains of Edith Finch, opining that the structure of such games, which requires players to explore environments and piece together the story through observation and discovery, offers little advantage over other storytelling mediums such as an animated film or novel. Bogost argues that the appeal of video games lies in their technical achievements, and that a game which chooses to focus on telling a story is "unambitious" and has no appeal that cannot be found in a more traditional work. During a panel held at the University of Southern California, Steven Spielberg and George Lucas expressed skepticism about the quality of storytelling in video games, asserting that the interactive element of the medium infringed upon the potential impact of any story a game might try to tell, with Lucas commenting, "By its very nature there cannot be a plot in a game."

In contrast, literary scholar Eric Hayot says that video games, while not directly comparable to novels or films, are an evolution of many long-enduring storytelling traditions that have been observed throughout human history. Hayot argues that interactivity "was a story mode for centuries, if not millennia, before the invention of the microprocessor." Hayot does qualify, however, that he believes the tradition of "winning" in a video game "provides an interesting brake" on the range of stories that can be told in the medium, though he cites Undertale and The Last of Us as two examples which subvert this tradition.

Some video game stories have been criticized for being conveyed in cutscenes perceived as being of excessive length which takes time away from the gameplay. Other critics have supported the inclusion of lower difficulty options which favor story over difficulty of play; for instance writer Oktay Ege Kozak, who expressed in Paste Magazine that while they enjoy playing video games for their stories, "I also suck at them" and would prefer that gameplay difficulty was not mandated in order to access a game's story. Such options have been included in various titles, such as Hades (where it is called "God Mode") and Mass Effect: Andromeda.

John Carmack, a developer of Doom, is often quoted as having said that "Story in a game is like a story in a porn movie. It's expected to be there, but it's not that important," a quote which originated from the book Masters of Doom. Carmack has since amended this opinion to acknowledge the existence of games where story is a greater focus; however, he still maintained that he believes games which prioritize gameplay are the "most important".

== See also ==
- Video game writing, an overview of the associated profession
- Ludonarrative dissonance
