= Out-of-box experience =

Experience an end-user has when taking a product after unboxing

Out-of-box experience in Windows 11

An out-of-box experience (OOBE (/ˈuːbiː/ OO-bee)) is the experience an end-user has when taking a product after unboxing, or for digital distribution, runs the installer, and is preparing to first use it, as opposed to the point-of-sale experience or the interaction experience of an expert user. In computing, this includes the initial configuration of a piece of hardware or software on a computer. The out-of-box experience is typically the first impression a product creates, such as the ease with which a buyer can begin using the product. For hardware products, a positive OOBE can be created with logical easy-to-follow instructions and good quality of manufacturing. It can also be defined as the experience an online shopper has when receiving an item in the mail, that begins with the box itself (style, design), how the item is presented when opening the box (packing material, pack configuration, how item is position when opening, cords neatly wrapped, etc.), what the paperwork looks like and includes (well designed packing slip, a thank you note from the vendor, return form, etc.).

Microsoft uses this term, particularly, to refer to the user experience that takes place after software installation, and immediately following the first launch of a software product.

== Out-of-box failure ==
An out-of-box failure (OBF or OOBF) refers to the perceived failure of a product that occurs immediately upon first usage. In relations to computing, an out-of-box failure can refer to the immediate failure mode when installing or performing initial configuration on a piece of computer hardware or software, or a physical defect involving the installation media which requires a return and acquisition of a non-defective product. Causes for out-of-box failures include poor quality control, wrong configuration of the product, and bugs/glitches if the failure is software-related. It can be highly detrimental to the value of the brand, retailer, or OEM, especially when customer expectations for the product are high.

== See also ==
- Unboxing
- First-time user experience
