= Pidoco =

Pidoco Usability Suite

- Pidoco Usability Suite
- Developer: Pidoco GmbH
- Stable release: 2010 (44) / 6 November 2010; 15 years ago
- Operating system: Windows, Mac OS, Linux
- Type: Prototyping software
- License: Proprietary commercial software
- Website: pidoco.com

The Pidoco Usability Suite (/pɪˈdoʊkoʊ/ pi-DOH-koh) is a now-defunct cloud-based collaboration software created by Pidoco GmbH for creating, sharing and testing wireframes, mockups, prototypes of websites, mobile apps, and enterprise software applications.

== Pidoco Usability Suite ==
The Pidoco Usability Suite is a cloud-based collaboration software for planning, designing, and testing websites, web applications, mobile apps, and enterprise software. The software to create clickable wireframes, mockups, and interactive low-fidelity prototypes of GUIs by using drag-and-drop placement of pre-fabricated elements.

Pidoco allows users to share projects with team members and other project stakeholders for real-time online collaboration, reviewing, and user testing. The web application is used to visualize requirements, collaborate in the design phases of software development, involve end users, and generate optimized specifications for traditional or agile development processes.

Pidoco is browser-based and thus compatible with Windows, Mac OS, and Linux.

== Functionality ==
Pidoco is structured into several views that give access to various functions which include:

- Editor – creating, sharing and exporting wireframes, mockups and prototypes.
- Simulator – reviewing and discussing projects and requirements.
- Tester – testing prototypes for usability with end users online.

== Versions ==
The Pidoco Usability Suite is marketed in three editions:

- Basic – the version which includes the editing functions.
- Classic – the version which includes all Basic functionalities and additional sharing options as well as real-time collaborative editing capability for teams.
- Expert – the version which includes all Classic functions as well as testing functionality and additional collaboration options like screen sharing, VoIP connection, chat and session recording.

== Compatibility ==
The Pidoco Usability Suite is a browser-based application that runs on various operating systems including Windows, Mac OS, and Linux. Supported browsers include Internet Explorer 7+, Firefox 3.0+, Chrome 4+, and Safari 4+ for the simulation and testing functions that allow teams to collaborate on prototypes by gathering feedback. Creating and editing prototypes is supported in Firefox 3.0+, Chrome 4+, and Safari 4+.

== Requirements ==
Pidoco is a JavaScript/SVG-based tool that uses open web standards. It is offered on the software-as-a-service (SaaS) model and does not require download or installation. The software can be accessed online via the application homepage, so a broad-band internet connection and a web browser software are necessary to use the Pidoco software.

== Software-as-a-Service ==
Pidoco operates on the Software-as-a-Service (SaaS) model, and is available as standard hosted SaaS option, hosted dedicated server option or as an in-house installation. Attributes of SaaS include flexibility and scalability, multi-tenant capability, recurring subscription fees rather than upfront capital cost, and require no internal hardware.

== See also ==
- Software prototyping
- Software visualization
- Website wireframe
- Collaboration
- Usability
- List of collaborative software
