= Microsoft reaction card method =

The Microsoft Reaction Card, developed by Microsoft in 2002 by Joey Benedek and Trish Miner, is a method used to check the emotional response and desirability of a design or product. This method is commonly used in the field of software design.

Using this method involves a participant describing a design / product based on a list of 118 words. Each word is placed on a separate card. After viewing a design or product, the participant is asked to pick out the words they feel are relevant. The moderator then asks the participant to explain the reason for their selection.
