= Paper prototyping =

Software design technique

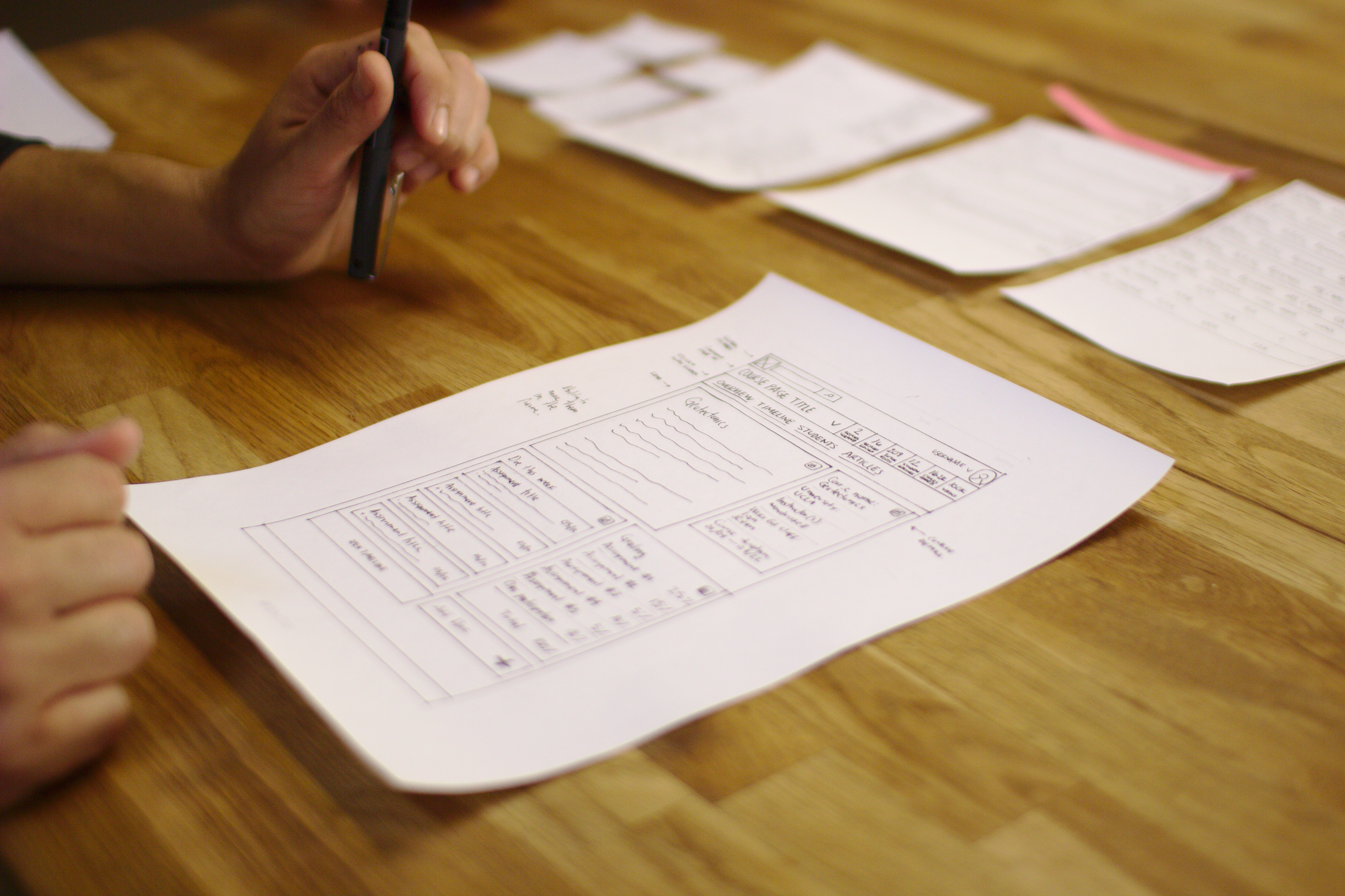
Paper prototyping of a website interface

In human–computer interaction, paper prototyping is a widely used method in the user-centered design process, a process that helps developers to create software that meets the user's expectations and needs – in this case, especially for designing and testing user interfaces. It is throwaway prototyping and involves creating rough, even hand-sketched, drawings of an interface to use as prototypes, or models, of a design. While paper prototyping seems simple, this method of usability testing can provide useful feedback to aid the design of easier-to-use products. This is supported by many usability professionals.

== History ==
Paper prototyping started in the mid-1980s and then became popular in the mid-1990s, when companies such as IBM, Honeywell, Microsoft, and others, started using the technique in developing their products. Today, paper prototyping is used widely in user-centered design by usability professionals. More recently, digital paper prototyping has been advocated by companies like Pidoco due to advantages in terms of collaboration, flexibility, and cost.

== Benefits ==
Paper prototyping saves time and money, since it enables developers to test product interfaces (from software and websites to cell phones and microwave ovens) before they write code or begin development. This also allows for easy and inexpensive modification to existing designs, which makes this method useful in the early phases of design. Using paper prototyping allows the entire creative team to be involved in the process, which eliminates the chance of someone with key information not being involved in the design process. Another benefit of paper prototyping is that users feel more comfortable being critical of the mock-up because it doesn't have a polished look.

There are different methods of paper prototyping, each of them showing several benefits regarding the communication within the development team, as well as the quality of the product being developed. In the development team, paper prototypes can serve as a visual specification of the graphical user interface – and by this means, assure the quality of the software. Prototyping forces a more complete design of the user interface to be captured. In team meetings, it provides a communication base between the team members. Testing prototypes at an early stage of development helps to identify software usability problems even before any code is written. The costs and annoyances of later changes are reduced, the support burden is lowered, and the overall quality of the software or website is increased.

Paper prototyping is a quick way to generate digital ideas by sketching on paper. In tight VPC workshop, quick ideas need to be explored and evaluated. Paper prototyping is usually the preferred tool to generate ideas visually and to evaluate them within the team and with target customers.

== Drawbacks ==
Despite many benefits as a quick and easy way to receive feedback on initial design ideas, this method also has certain drawbacks. One of the most important factors in prototyping is the context in which the prototype is being created. Depending on the current stage of development, a paper prototype may not be the best choice for conveying the proposed design ideas. Paper prototypes should only be used in the beginning stages of the design process – typically as the first form of prototype created – since minimal functionality can actually be expressed on paper. They help flesh out ideas, encourage experimentation with unconventional designs, and provide rapid feedback on basic usability – but ultimately, paper prototypes would not serve as sufficient products to present to clients.

Another large drawback of paper prototypes is the level of imagination required from test participants in interpreting how to interact with the design. Since all interactions are being staged by a facilitator during paper prototype testing sessions, there is a potential for the feedback to be skewed as a result. Users have to imagine what their interactions would look like in a digital space; however, their mental models may not represent how the future state of the interface will actually be implemented. Further, users are often distracted by the whimsical performance of the facilitator as they move components around, as well as by their own acting to fake interactions, which would also impact the quality of feedback.

Lastly, paper prototypes can only be tested in person, since test participants are instructed to physically interact with the prototype by pretending to "press" on buttons or moving components around to simulate how the website would change after an action has been taken. However, with an increasingly digitized world and a movement toward remote work, this poses an obstacle for conducting paper prototype testing. In addition, it is difficult to recruit participants from geographically dispersed areas with the constraint of in-person testing. Consequently, this might create bias in the feedback, since it would be ideal to receive insight into the needs of different, geographically diverse user groups.

== Usage ==
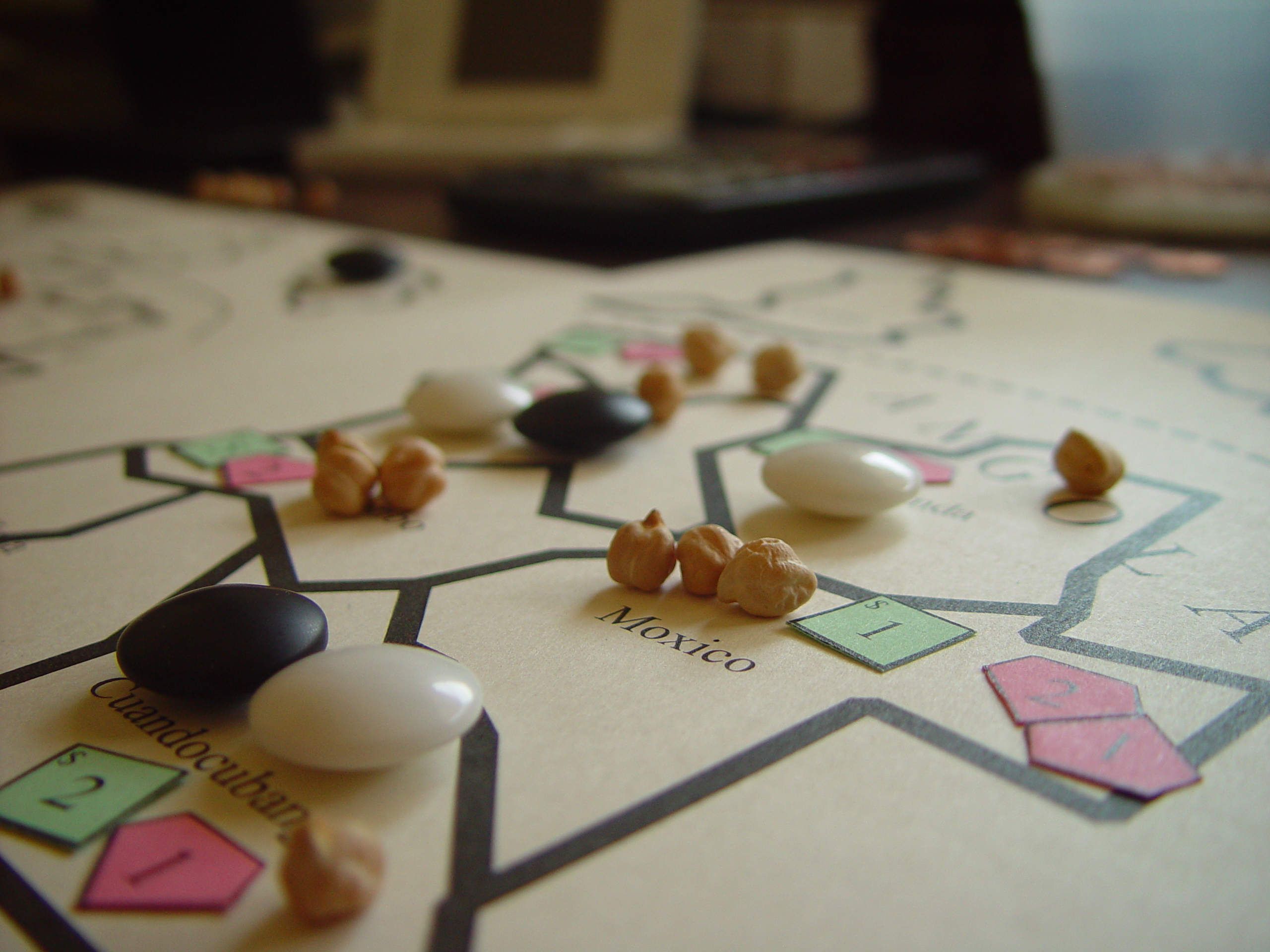
A paper prototype of the 2012 videogame Diamond Trust of London

Paper prototypes should be considered when the following is true:

- The tools the designer wants to use in creating a prototype are not available.
- The designer wants to make a sincere effort to allow all members of a team, including those with limited software skills, to take part in the design process.
- Tests of a design lead to a great deal of drawings.
- The ideas need to be generated quickly and evaluated in a short period of time.
- There is a co-creation workshop needing customers and designers to generate ideas together.

The most important areas of application of paper prototypes are the following:

Communication within a team
One of the major applications of paper prototyping is brainstorming in the development team, to collect and visualize ideas on how an interface might look. The interface is built up step by step, meeting the expectations of all team members. To explore the applicability of the software design, typical use cases are played through and possible pitfalls are identified. The prototype can then be used as a visual specification of the software.

Usability testing
Paper prototypes can be used for usability testing with real users. In such a test, the user performs realistic tasks by interacting with the paper prototype. The prototype is manipulated by another person reflecting the software's reactions to the user input actions. Though seemingly unsophisticated, this method is very successful at discovering usability issues early in the design process.

Three techniques of paper prototyping used for usability testing are compositions (comps), wireframes, and storyboards. Comps are visual representations, commonly of websites, that demonstrate various aspects of the interface, including fonts, colors, and logos. A wireframe is used to demonstrate the page layout of the interface. Lastly, storyboards are a series or images that are used to demonstrate how an interface works. These three techniques are useful and can be turned into paper prototypes.

Design testing
Especially in web design, paper prototypes can be used to examine the illegibility of a design. A high-fidelity design mock-up of a page is printed and presented to a user. Among other relevant issues, the user is asked to identify the main navigation, clickable elements, etc. Paper prototyping is also the recommended design testing technique in the contextual design process.

Information architecture
By applying general and wide paper prototypes, the information architecture of a piece of software or a web site can be tested. Users are asked where they would search for certain functionality or settings in software, or topics in a web site. According to the percentage of correct answers, the information architecture can be approved or further refined.

Rapid prototyping
Paper prototyping is often used as the first step of rapid prototyping. Rapid prototyping involves a group of designers who each create a paper prototype and test it on a single user. After this is done, the designers share their feedback and ideas, at which point each of them creates a second prototype – this time using presentation software. Functionality is similarly unimportant, but in this case, the aesthetics are closer to the final product. Again, each designer's computer prototype is tested on a single user, and the designers meet to share feedback. At this point, actual software prototypes can be created. Usually after these steps have been taken, the actual software is user-friendly the first time around, which saves programming time.

== See also ==
- Prototyping
- Software prototyping
- User-centered design
- Cardboard engineering
- Virtual prototyping
