= User experience design =

Field of design focusing on the creation of user-centered products and websites

User experience design (UX design, UXD, UED, or XD), upon which is the centralized requirements for "User Experience Design Research" (also known as UX Design Research), defines the experience a user would go through when interacting with a company, its services, and its products. User experience design is a user centered design approach because it considers the user's experience when using a product or platform. Research, data analysis, and test results drive design decisions in UX design rather than aesthetic preferences and opinions, for which is known as UX Design Research. Unlike user interface design, which focuses solely on the design of a computer interface, UX design encompasses all aspects of a user's perceived experience with a product or website, such as its usability, usefulness, desirability, brand perception, and overall performance. UX design is also an element of the customer experience (CX), and encompasses all design aspects and design stages that are around a customer's experience.

== History ==
User experience design is a conceptual design discipline rooted in human factors and ergonomics. This field since the late 1940s has focused on the interaction between human users, machines, and contextual environments to design systems that address the user's experience. User experience became a positive insight for designers in the early 1990s with the proliferation of workplace computers. Don Norman, a professor and researcher in design, usability, and cognitive science, coined the term "user experience", and brought it to a wider audience that is inside our modernized society.

I invented the term because I thought human interface and usability were too narrow. I wanted to cover all aspects of the person's experience with the system including industrial design graphics, the interface, the physical interaction and the manual. Since then the term has spread widely, so much so that it is starting to lose its meaning.

— Donald Norman

== Elements ==
=== Research ===
User experience design draws from design approaches like human-computer interaction and user-centered design. It includes elements from similar disciplines like interaction design, visual design, information architecture, user research, and others.

Another portion of the research is understanding the end-user and the purpose of the application. Though this might seem clear to the designer, stepping back and empathizing with the user will yield the best results.

It helps to identify and prove or disprove assumptions, find commonalities across target audience members, and recognize their needs, goals, and mental models.

=== Visual design ===
Visual design, also commonly known as graphic design, user interface design, communication design, and visual communication, represents the aesthetics or look and feel of the front end of any user interface. Graphic treatment of interface elements is often perceived as the visual design. The purpose of visual design is to use visual elements like colors, images, and symbols to convey a message to its audience. Fundamentals of Gestalt psychology and visual perception give a cognitive perspective on how to create effective visual communication.

=== Information architecture ===
Information architecture is the art and science of structuring and organizing the information in products and services to support usability and findability.

In the context of information architecture, information is separate from both knowledge and data, and lies nebulously between them. It is information about objects. The objects can range from websites, to software applications, to images et al. It is also concerned with metadata, or data used to describe and represent content objects such as documents, people, process, and organizations. Information architecture also encompasses how the pages and navigation are structured.

=== Interaction design ===
Interaction design is an essential component of user experience (UX) design, that focuses on the interaction between users and products. The primary goal of interaction design is to create a product that produces an efficient and delightful end-user experience by enabling users to achieve their objectives in the best way possible.

The growing emphasis on user-centered design and the focus on enhancing user experience have made interaction designers essential in shaping products that align with user expectations and adhere to the latest UI patterns and components.

In the last few years, the role of interaction designer has shifted from being just focused on specifying UI components and communicating them to the engineers to a situation in which designers have more freedom to design contextual interfaces based on helping meet the user's needs. Therefore, User Experience Design evolved into a multidisciplinary design branch that involves multiple technical aspects from motion graphics design, animation. programming to even service design.

=== Usability ===
Usability is the extent to which a product can be used by specified users to achieve specified goals with effectiveness, efficiency and satisfaction in a specified context of use.

Usability is attached to all tools used by humans and is extended to both digital and non-digital devices. Thus, it is a subset of user experience but not wholly contained. The section of usability that intersects with user experience design is related to humans' ability to use a system or application. Good usability is essential to positive user experience but does not alone guarantee it.

=== Accessibility ===
Accessibility of a system describes its ease of reach, use, and understanding. In terms of user experience design, it can also be related to the overall comprehensibility of the information and features. It helps shorten the learning curve associated with the system. Accessibility in many contexts can be related to the ease of use for people with disabilities and comes under usability. In addition, accessible design is the concept of services, products, or facilities in which designers should accommodate and consider for the needs of people with disabilities. The Web Content Accessibility Guidelines (WCAG) state that all content must adhere to the four main principles of POUR: Perceivable, Operable, Understandable, and Robust.

==== WCAG compliance ====
Web Content Accessibility Guidelines (WCAG) 2.0 covers a wide range of recommendations for making Web content more accessible. This makes web content more usable to users in general. Making content more usable and readily accessible to all types of users enhances a user's overall user experience.

=== Human–computer interaction ===
Human–computer interaction is concerned with the design, evaluation and implementation of interactive computing systems for human use and with the study of major phenomena surrounding them.

==== Getting ready to design ====
After research, the designer uses the modeling of the users and their environments. User modeling or personas are composite archetypes based on behavior patterns uncovered during research. Personas provide designers a precise way of thinking and communicating about how groups of users behave, how they think, what they want to accomplish and why. Once created, personas help the designer to understand the users' goals in specific contexts, which is particularly useful during ideation and for validating design concepts. Other types of models include workflow models, artifact models, and physical models.

==== Design ====
When the designer has a solid understanding of the user's needs and goals, they begin to sketch out the interaction framework (also known as wireframes). This stage defines the high-level structure of screen layouts, as well as the product's flow, behavior, and organization. There are many kinds of materials that can be involved during this iterative phase, from whiteboards to paper prototypes. As the interaction framework establishes an overall structure for product behavior, a parallel process focused on the visual and industrial designs. The visual design framework defines the experience attributes, visual language, and the visual style.

Once a solid and stable framework is established, wireframes are translated from sketched storyboards to full-resolution screens that depict the user interface at the pixel level. At this point, it is critical for the programming team to collaborate closely with the designer. Their input is necessary to create a finished design that can and will be built while remaining true to the concept.

==== User research ====
User research is the systematic study of target users and their requirements in order to add realistic contexts and insights to the design process. It commonly involves methods such as interviews, surveys, field studies, and contextual inquiry. The data gathered from user research helps designers understand user goals, behaviors, and pain points, which in turn informs design decisions throughout the product lifecycle. By grounding design choices in evidence rather than assumptions, user research reduces the risk of creating products that fail to meet user needs. It also supports the creation of user personas and scenarios, which help maintain a user-centered focus during design and development.

== UX deliverables ==
UX designers perform a number of different tasks and, therefore, use a range of deliverables to communicate their design ideas and research findings to stakeholders. Regarding UX specification documents, these requirements depend on the client or the organization involved in designing a product. The four major deliverables are: a title page, an introduction to the feature, wireframes, and a version history. Depending on the type of project, the specification documents can also include flow models, cultural models, personas, user stories, scenarios, and any prior user research.

The deliverables that UX designers will produce as part of their job include wireframes, prototypes, user flow diagrams, specification and tech docs, websites and applications, mockups, presentations, personas, user profiles, videos, and, to a lesser degree, reports. Documenting design decisions, in the form of annotated wireframes, gives the developer the necessary information they may need to successfully code the project.

=== After launching a project ===
Requires:

- User testing/usability testing
- A/B testing
- Information architecture
- Sitemaps and user flows
- Additional wireframing as a result of test results and fine-tuning

=== Pixel perfect ===
Pixel perfect, or pixel-perfect precision, is a term used in web development to describe that a digital product appears accurately as intended by the user interface or user experience designer.

== UX stakeholders ==
A user experience designer is considered a UX practitioner, along with the following job titles: user experience researcher, information architect, interaction designer, human factors engineer, business analyst, consultant, creative director, interaction architect, and usability specialist.

=== Interaction designers ===
Interaction designers (IxD) are responsible for understanding and specifying how the product should behave. This work overlaps with the work of both visual and industrial designers in a couple of important ways. When designing physical products, interaction designers must work with industrial designers early on to specify the requirements for physical inputs and to understand the behavioral impacts of the mechanisms behind them. Interaction designers cross paths with visual designers throughout the project. Visual designers guide the discussions of the brand and emotive aspects of the experience, Interaction designers communicate the priority of information, flow, and functionality in the interface.

=== Technical communicators ===
Historically, technical and professional communication (TPC) has been as an industry that practices writing and communication. However, recently UX design has become more prominent in TPC as companies look to develop content for a wide range of audiences and experiences. It is now an expectation that technical and professional skills should be coupled with UX design. According to Verhulsdonck, Howard, and Tham, "...it is not enough to write good content. According to industry expectations, next to writing good content, it is now also crucial to design good experiences around that content." Technical communicators must now consider different platforms such as social media and apps, as well as different channels like web and mobile.

==== UX writers ====
In a similar manner, coupling TPC with UX design allows technical communicators to garner evidence on target audiences. UX writers, a branch of technical communicators, specialize in crafting content for mobile platforms while executing a user-centered approach. UX writers focus on developing content to guide users through interfaces, applications, and websites. Their responsibilities include maintaining UI text, conducting user research for usability testing, and developing the tone for a product's communication.

UX writers maintain the practices of technical communicators, by developing documentation that establishes consistency in terminology and tone, promoting a cohesive user experience. However, beyond the writing, UX writers maintain UI text by ensuring that microscopy, such as button labels, error messages, and tooltips, remains user-friendly, as well. In doing this, the writers are also tasked with ensuring accessibility—considering issues like screen reader compatibility or providing non-text elements, such as icons. UX writers conduct extensive research to understand the behaviors and preferences of the target audience through user testing and feedback analysis. These methods of research can include user persona creation and user surveys. Lastly, when setting the tone in a product's communication, UX writers highlight factors that affect user engagement and perception. In short, the writers consider the product's emotional impact on the users, and align the tone with brand's personality.

Within the field of UX design, UX writers bridge the gaps between various fields to create a cohesive and user-centric experience. Their expertise in language and communication work to unify design, development, and user research teams by ensuring that the user interface's content aligns with the broader objectives of the product or service. By focusing on clarity, consistency, and empathy, UX writers contribute to the integration of design elements, technical functionality, and user preferences, while following a design process to ensure products with intuitive, accessible, and responsive behavior to user needs.

=== User interface designers ===
User interface (UI) design is the process of making interfaces in software or computerized devices with a focus on looks or style. Designers aim to create designs users will find easy to use and pleasurable. UI design typically refers to graphical user interfaces but also includes others, such as voice-controlled ones.

=== Visual designers ===
The visual designer ensures that the visual representation of the design effectively communicates the data and hints at the expected behavior of the product. At the same time, the visual designer is responsible for conveying the brand ideals in the product and for creating a positive first impression; this responsibility is shared with the industrial designer if the product involves hardware. In essence, a visual designer must aim for maximum usability combined with maximum desirability. Visual designer need not be good in artistic skills but must deliver the theme in a desirable manner.

== UX design testing ==
Usability testing is the most common method designers use to test their designs. The basic idea behind conducting a usability test is to check whether the design of a product or brand works well with the target users. Usability testing is about testing whether the product's design is successful and, if not, how it can be improved.

While designers conduct tests, they are not testing for the user but for the design. Further, every design is evolving, with both UX design and design thinking moving in the direction of Agile software development. The designers carry out usability testing as early and often as possible, ensuring that every aspect of the final product has been tested.

Usability tests play an important role in the delivery of a cohesive final product; however, a variety of factors influence the testing process. Evaluating qualitative and quantitative methods provides an adequate picture of UX designs, and one of these quantitative methods is A/B testing (see Usability testing). Another key concept in the efficacy of UX design testing is the idea of a persona or the representation of the most common user of a certain website or program, and how these personas would interact with the design in question. At the core of UX design usability testing is the user; however, steps in automating design testing have been made, with Micron developing the Advanced Test Environment (ATE), which automates UX tests on Android-powered smartphones. While quantitative software tools that collect actionable data, such as loggers and mobile agents, provide insight into a user's experience, the qualitative responses that arise from live, user based UX design testing are lost. The ATE serves to simulate a devices movement that affects design orientation and sensor operation in order to estimate the actual experience of the user based on previously collected user testing data.

== See also ==
- Action research
- Activity-centered design
- Agile software development
- Attentive user interface
- Customer experience
- Design thinking
- Paper prototyping
- Participatory design
- Process-centered design
- User advocacy
- User experience
- User experience evaluation
