= Ludonarrative dissonance =

Phenomenon in games

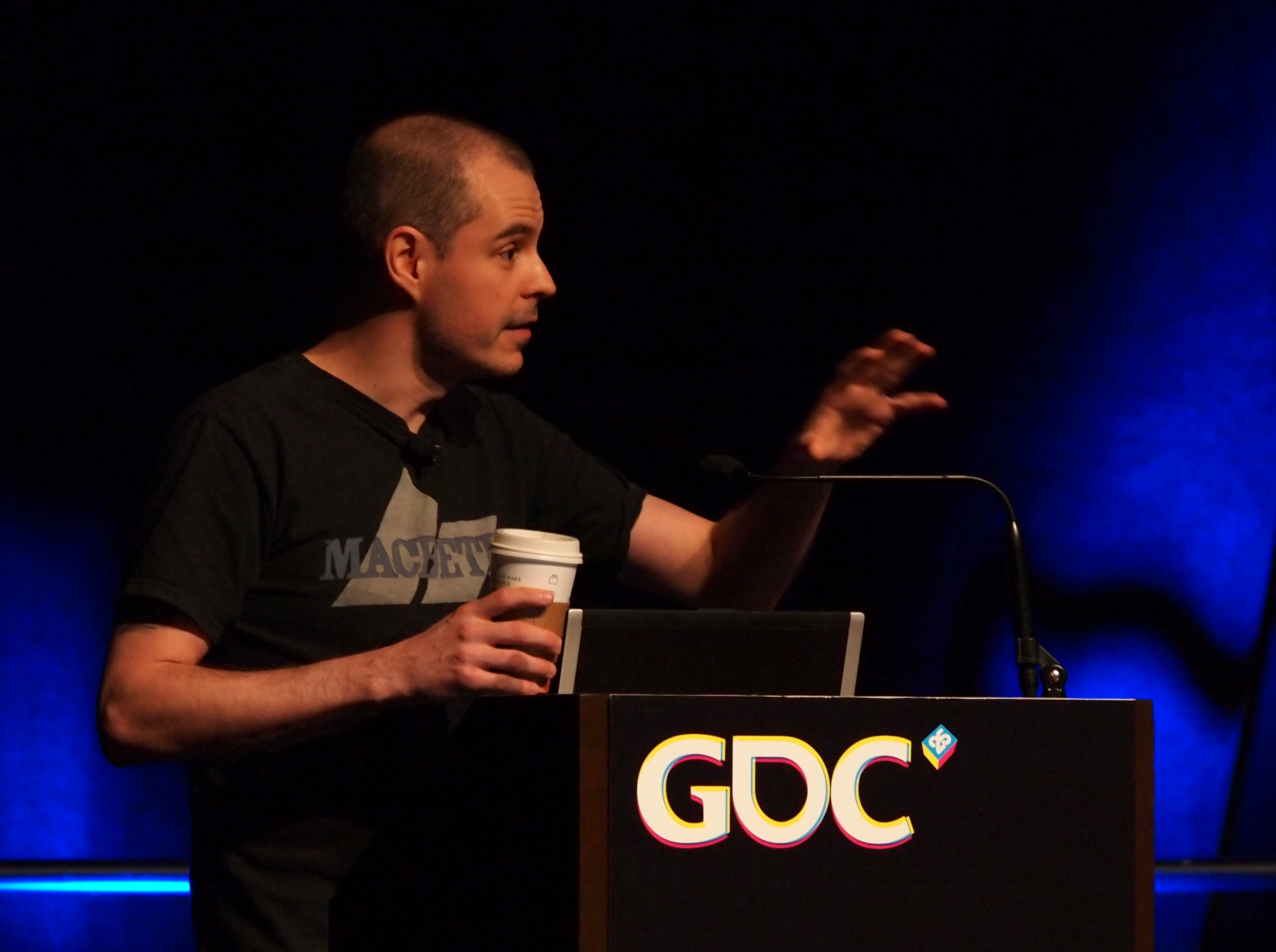
Hocking delivering a keynote at GDC in March 2011

Ludonarrative dissonance is the perceived conflict between a video game's narrative told through the non-interactive elements and the narrative told through the gameplay. Ludonarrative, a portmanteau of ludology and narrative, refers to the intersection of a video game's ludic elements (gameplay) and narrative elements. The term was coined by game designer Clint Hocking in 2007.

== Origins ==
Canadian video game designer and director Clint Hocking coined the term ludonarrative dissonance in an October 2007 blog post about the game BioShock. As explained by Hocking, BioShock is themed around the principles of Objectivism and the nature of free will, taking place in a dystopia within the underwater city of Rapture.

During the game, the player character encounters Little Sisters, young girls that have been conditioned to extract a rare resource from corpses, which is used as a means to increase the player character's abilities. The player has the option of following what Hocking describes as the Objectivist approach by killing the Little Sister and gaining a larger amount of the resource, or following a compassionate approach, freeing the girl from the conditioning and only receiving a modest amount of the resource in return. According to Hocking, this choice upholds the nature of free will that the gameplay presents.

Hocking then notes that as the story progresses, the player character is forced into accepting one specific path—to help the person behind the revolution within Rapture—and given no option to challenge that role. This seemingly strips away the notion of free will that the gameplay had offered. Hocking argues that BioShock thus promotes the theme of self-interest through its gameplay while promoting the opposing theme of selflessness through its narrative, creating a violation of aesthetic distance that often pulls the player out of the game.

== Use ==
Jonathan Blow also used BioShock as an example of ludonarrative dissonance in his 2008 talk. Writer Tom Bissell, in his 2010 book Extra Lives: Why Video Games Matter, notes the example of Call of Duty 4: Modern Warfare, where a player can all but kill their digital partner during gameplay without upsetting the built-in narrative of the game. Brett Makedonski of Destructoid used the Mass Effect series as another example, in which the player character Commander Shepard can perform actions that are seen as ethically good (Paragon) or bad (Renegade), but throughout the game, Shepard is still regarded as a hero regardless of how much of a Renegade status they may have obtained.

Jeffrey Matulef of Eurogamer used the term when referencing the Uncharted series, saying that "Uncharted has often been mocked for being about a supposedly likable rogue who just so happens to recklessly slaughter hundreds of people". Uncharted 4: A Thief's End acknowledged the criticism with a trophy called "Ludonarrative Dissonance" that is awarded to the player for killing 1,000 enemies. The game's co-director Neil Druckmann said that in Uncharted 4, the studio was "conscious to have fewer fights, but it came more from a desire to have a different kind of pacing than to answer the 'ludonarrative dissonance' argument. Because we don't buy into it".

Chris Plante of Polygon wrote there had been an increasing number of games being designed around violence such that the story shifted to accommodate gameplay, rather than vice versa. He considered the game The Last of Us Part II (also directed by Druckmann) to be the culmination of this ludonarrative dissonance because its plot is a cautionary tale on violence and revenge while its gameplay is built around violent combat with no alternative options for the player. Plante argued that due to the appeal and constant supply of violent games, it was unnecessary for them to justify why their player characters exhibited violence, and expressed his desire for more games to tell stories that didn't hinge around violence.

== Analysis ==
In a 2016 article, semiotician Frédéric Seraphine identifies the purpose of ludonarrative dissonance as an opposition between "incentives" and "directives" within the "ludic structure (the gameplay)" and the "narrative structure (the story)".

Some scholars, game writers, and journalists have challenged the supposedly negative nature of ludonarrative dissonance. In a 2015 article, Nick Ballantyne, managing editor at GameCloud Australia, writes:

What if it could be used to a dev's advantage? Video games can force players into uncomfortable situations, and ludonarrative dissonance can help foster that uncomfortableness. Faux glitches have been used as (ludo)narrative tools before in games such as Eternal Darkness: Sanity's Requiem and Metal Gear Solid 2: Sons of Liberty, so why is ludonarrative dissonance avoided so much? If your intent is to unsettle or confuse a player, then ludonarrative dissonance seems perfect, but it heavily relies on the player.

While acknowledging the potential of ludonarrative dissonance to create what he calls "emersion", defined in opposition to "immersion" as the "sensation of being pulled out of the play experience", Seraphine agrees with Ballantyne that it is possible to purposefully use ludonarrative dissonance as a storytelling device. Seraphine concludes with:

It seems that more games in the near future might use ludonarrative dissonance as a way to tell more compelling stories. In essence, stories are about characters and the most interesting stories are often told with dissonant characters; as it is the surprise, the disturbance, the accident, the sacrosanct disruptive element, that justifies the very act of telling a story.

In a 2013 Game Developers Conference talk, Spec Ops: The Line writer Walt Williams argued that embracing ludonarrative dissonance allows the developer to portray the character as a hypocrite and forces the player to rationalize their actions.

=== Ludonarrative consistency ===
In contrast to ludonarrative dissonance, ludonarrative consistency (or consonance or harmony) can be considered the use of gameplay mechanics to positively reinforce the narrative. For example, deliberately difficult controls could be used to simulate drunkenness or confusion. Pathologic 2 takes advantage of difficult controls to simulate illness and various states of exhaustion.

Alternatively, mechanics and narrative can be intertwined to the point where gameplay is itself an element of the story. Gerald Farca argues, citing Journey as an example, that a game's communication and aesthetic affect relies on its interactions between a player, culture, and a text that "exhibits virtual (indeterminate) qualities", allowing players to participate directly in forming meaning through gameplay. In other words, the act of play becomes the experience of the narrative itself.

It has been argued that through high ludonarrative consistency, video games are able to accomplish what other forms of non-interactive art cannot by form. In Papers, Please, gameplay revolves around the checking of paperwork under strict time limits and moral decisions that have to be made in mere seconds, mirroring the real life task of high pressure paperwork. Lucas Pope, the game's creator, stated in a 2013 interview that "people with similar jobs have told me that the mechanics in the game are close to what they do ... Once I started considering the concept, the gameplay mechanics and story grew from what I thought would make a fun game." The gameplay itself becomes a core part the game's commentary on borders, bureaucracy, and the concept of the iron cage, in a manner that could not be accomplished in other mediums.

The manner in which ludonarrative consistency is accomplished can differ according to genre. Jon Stone explores Disco Elysium as an example of a game attempting to integrate gameplay and narrative. In the game, the player gathers context through bizarre and inappropriate interactions that are nevertheless tolerated by other characters due to the protagonist's position as a police officer, contributing to the narrative's commentary on law enforcement. Brett Makedonski describes how the gameplay of the Dead Space series conveys the sense of sheer terror and loneliness, supporting the atmosphere that the narrative also strives to establish.
