= Website wireframe =

Visual guide that represents the skeletal framework of a website

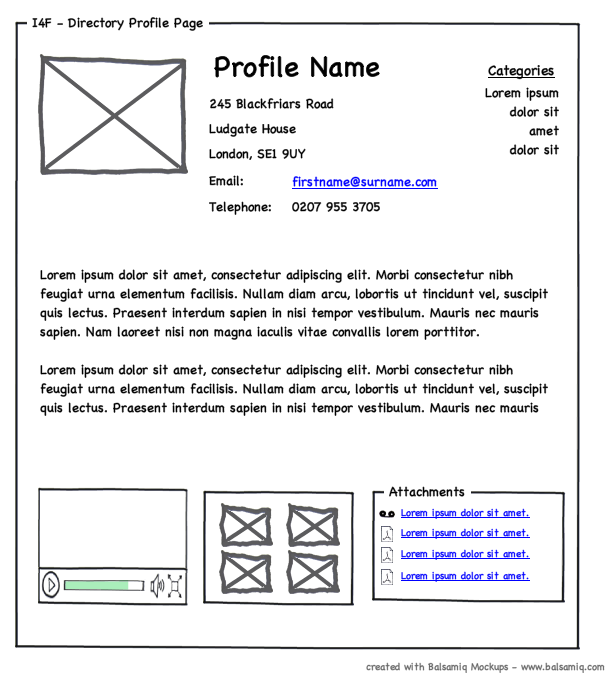
A wireframe document for a person profile view

A website wireframe, also known as a page schematic or screen blueprint, is a visual guide that represents the skeletal framework of a website. The term wireframe is taken from other fields that use a skeletal framework to represent 3-dimensional shape and volume. Wireframes are created for the purpose of arranging elements to best accomplish a particular purpose. The purpose is usually driven by a business objective and a creative idea.

The wireframe depicts the page layout or arrangement of the website's content, including interface elements and navigational systems, and how they work together. The wireframe usually lacks typographic style, color, or graphics, since the main focus lies in functionality, behavior, and priority of content. In other words, it focuses on what a screen does, not what it looks like.

Wireframes can be pencil drawings or sketches on a whiteboard, or they can be produced by means of a broad array of free or commercial software applications. Wireframes are generally created by business analysts, user experience designers, developers, visual designers, and by those with expertise in interaction design, information architecture, and user research.

Wireframes focus on:

- The range of functions available
- The relative priorities of the information and functions
- The rules for displaying certain kinds of information
- The effect of different scenarios on the display

The website wireframe connects the underlying conceptual structure, or information architecture, to the surface, or visual design of the website. Wireframes help establish functionality and the relationships between different screen templates of a website. An iterative process, creating wireframes is an effective way to make rapid prototypes of pages, while measuring the practicality of a design concept. Wireframing typically begins between "high-level structural work—like flowcharts or site maps—and screen designs." Within the process of building a website, wireframing is where thinking becomes tangible.

Wireframes are also utilized for the prototyping of mobile sites, computer applications, or other screen-based products that involve human-computer interaction.

== Uses of wireframes ==
Wireframes may be utilized by different disciplines. Developers use wireframes to get a more tangible grasp of the site's functionality, while designers use them to push the user interface (UI) process. User experience designers and information architects use wireframes to show navigation paths between pages. Business analysts use wireframes to visually support the business rules and interaction requirements for a screen.

Business stakeholders review wireframes to ensure that requirements and objectives are met through the design. Professionals who create wireframes include business analysts, information architects, interaction designers, user experience designers, graphic designers, programmers, and product managers.

Many hosted website builders incorporate layout‑planning functionality within their design interfaces. Platforms like Wix, Dorik, and Duda use templates and drag‑and‑drop editors that let people experiment with page structure and layout and preview changes before publishing a website.

Working with wireframes may be a collaborative effort since it bridges the information architecture to the visual design. Due to overlaps in these professional roles, conflicts may occur, making wireframing a controversial part of the design process. Since wireframes signify a "bare bones" aesthetic, it is difficult for designers to assess how closely the wireframe needs to depict actual screen layouts.

To avoid conflicts it is recommended that business analysts who understand the user requirements, create a basic wire frame and then work with designers to further improve the wireframes. Another difficulty with wireframes is that they don't effectively display interactive details because they are static representations. Modern UI design incorporates various devices such as expanding panels, hover effects, and carousels that pose a challenge for 2-D diagrams.

The main benefit of wireframes is that they can be used to iterate on any interface in an agile manner. This happens through a process oftentimes referred to as usability tests, where users are provided with an opportunity to interact with the interface and either think aloud about their thought process or answer more structured questions throughout. After each trial with a user, a user experience researcher can identify common interactions with the interface, synthesize the data, and redesign accordingly.

Due to the generally lower-fidelity nature of wireframe, it is very easy and cost-efficient to make changes. The point of a wireframe is to capture the design of the fundamental structure, high-level interaction pattern within an interface, otherwise known as the critical points, so it really allows a designer to work quickly, perfect for an agile environment where group members work collaboratively to "sprint" to the next iteration.

Wireframes may have different levels of detail and can be broken up into two categories in terms of fidelity, or how closely they resemble the end product.

=== Low-fidelity ===
Resembling a rough sketch or a quick mock-up, low-fidelity wireframes can be quickly produced. These wireframes help a project team communicate ideas and collaborate more effectively since they are more abstract, using rectangles and labeling to represent content. Dummy content, Latin filler text (lorem ipsum), sample or symbolic content are used to represent data when real content is not available. For example, instead of using actual images, a placeholder rectangle can be used.

Low-fidelity wireframes can be used to facilitate team communication on a project and is used in the early stages of a project. They are valued for their ability to focus stakeholder discussions on structure and functionality rather than visual aesthetics, reducing premature design debates. Low-fidelity wireframes are typically created using simple tools like pen and paper, whiteboards, or basic digital applications, allowing for rapid iteration with minimal resource investment.

=== High-fidelity ===
High-fidelity wireframes are often used for documenting because they incorporate a level of detail that more closely matches the design of the actual webpage, thus taking longer to create.

For simple or low-fidelity drawings, paper prototyping is a common technique. Since these sketches are just representations, annotations—adjacent notes to explain behavior—are useful. For more complex projects, rendering wireframes using computer software is popular. Some tools allow the incorporation of interactivity including Flash animation, and front-end web technologies such as, HTML, CSS, and JavaScript.

High fidelity wireframes include more real content, specific typography choices, and information on image dimensions. Unlike low fidelity wireframes, high fidelity wireframes can include actual images. Color choices are not included, but different values in color can be represented in grayscale.

== Elements of wireframes ==
The skeleton plan of a website can be broken down into three components: information design, navigation design, and interface design. Page layout is where these components come together, while wireframing is what depicts the relationship between these components.

=== Information design ===
Information design is the presentation—placement and prioritization of information in a way that facilitates understanding. Information design is an area of user experience design, meant to display information effectively for clear communication. For websites, information elements should be arranged in a way that reflects the goals and tasks of the user.

=== Navigation design ===
The navigation system provides a set of screen elements that allow the user to move page to page through the website. The navigation design should communicate the relationship between the links it contains so that users understand the options they have for navigating the site. Often, websites contain multiple navigation systems, such as global navigation, local navigation, supplementary navigation, contextual navigation, and courtesy navigation.

=== Interface design ===
User interface design includes selecting and arranging interface elements to enable users to interact with the functionality of the system. The goal is to facilitate usability and efficiency as much as possible. Common elements found in interface design are action buttons, text fields, check boxes, radio buttons, and drop-down menus.

== See also ==
- Blueprint
- Comprehensive layout
- Graphic design
- Information architecture
- Interaction design
- User experience design
- User interface design
- Web design
