= User experience =

Human interaction with a particular product, system or service

User experience (UX) is how a user interacts with and experiences a product, system, or service. It includes a person's perceptions of utility, ease of use, and efficiency. Improving user experience is important to most companies, designers, and creators when creating and refining products because negative user experience can diminish the use of the product and, therefore, any desired positive impacts. Conversely, designing toward profitability as a main objective often conflicts with ethical user experience objectives and even causes harm. User experience is subjective. However, the attributes that make up the user experience are objective.

== Definitions ==
According to Nielsen Norman Group, 'user experience' includes all the aspects of the interaction between the end-user with the company, its services, and its products.

The international standard on ergonomics of human-system interaction, ISO 9241, defines user experience as a "user's perceptions and responses that result from the use and/or anticipated use of a system, product or service". According to the ISO definition, user experience includes all the users' emotions, beliefs, preferences, perceptions, physical and psychological responses, behaviors, and accomplishments that occur before, during, and after use. The ISO also lists three factors that influence user experience: the system, the user, and the context of use.

Note 3 of the standard hints that usability addresses aspects of user experience, e.g., "usability criteria can be used to assess aspects of user experience". The standard does not go further in clarifying the relation between user experience and usability. Clearly, the two are overlapping concepts, with usability including pragmatic aspects (getting a task done) and user experience focusing on users' feelings stemming from both pragmatic and hedonic aspects of the system. Many practitioners use the terms interchangeably. The term "usability" pre-dates the term "user experience". Part of the reason the terms are often used interchangeably is that, as a practical matter, a user will, at a minimum, require sufficient usability to accomplish a task, while the feelings of the user may be less important, even to the user themselves. Since usability is about getting a task done, aspects of user experience like information architecture and user interface can help or hinder a user's experience. If a website has "bad" information architecture and a user has a difficult time finding what they are looking for, then the user will not have an effective, efficient, and satisfying search.

In addition to the ISO standard, there exist several other definitions for user experience. Some of them have been studied by various researchers.

== History ==
Early developments in user experience can be traced back to the Machine Age, which includes the 19th and early 20th centuries. Inspired by the machine age intellectual framework, the quest to improve assembly processes and increase production efficiency and output led to the development of major technological advancements, such as the mass production of high-volume goods on moving assembly lines, high-speed printing presses, large hydroelectric power plants, and radio technology, to name a few.

Frederick Winslow Taylor and Henry Ford explored ways to make human labor more efficient and productive. Taylor's research into the efficiency of interactions between workers and their tools is the earliest example that resembles today's user experience fundamentals.

The term user experience was brought to wider knowledge by Donald Norman in the mid-1990s. He never intended the term "user experience" to be applied only to the affective aspects of usage. A review of his earlier work suggests that the term "user experience" was used to signal a shift to include affective factors, along with the pre-requisite behavioral concerns, which had been traditionally considered in the field. Many usability practitioners continue to research and attend to affective factors associated with end-users, and have been doing so for years, long before the term "user experience" was introduced in the mid-1990s. In an interview in 2007, Norman discusses the widespread use of the term "user experience" and its imprecise meaning as a consequence thereof.

Several developments contributed to the rise of interest in user experience:

1. Recent advances in mobile, ubiquitous, social, and tangible computing technologies have moved human-computer interaction into practically all areas of human activity. This has led to a shift away from usability engineering to a much richer scope of user experience, where users' feelings, motivations, and values are given as much, if not more, attention than efficiency, effectiveness, and basic subjective satisfaction (i.e., the three traditional usability metrics)
2. In website design, it was important to combine the interests of different stakeholders: marketing, branding, visual design, and usability. Marketing and branding people needed to enter the interactive world where usability was important. Usability people needed to take marketing, branding, and aesthetic needs into account when designing websites. User experience provided a platform to cover the interests of all stakeholders: making websites easy to use, valuable, and effective for visitors. This is why several early user experience publications focus on website user experience.

The field of user experience represents an expansion and extension of the field of usability to include the holistic perspective of how a person feels about using a system. The focus is on pleasure, value, and performance. The exact definition, framework, and elements of user experience are still evolving.

User experience of an interactive product or a website is usually measured by a number of methods, including questionnaires, focus groups, observed usability tests, user journey mapping and other methods. A freely available questionnaire (available in several languages) is the User Experience Questionnaire (UEQ). The development and validation of this questionnaire is described in a computer science essay published in 2008.

Higher levels of user experience have been linked to increased effectiveness of digital health interventions targeting improvements in physical activity, nutrition, mental health and smoking.

Google Ngram Viewer shows wide use of the term starting in the 1930s. "He suggested that more follow-up in the field would be welcomed by the user, and would be a means of incorporating the results of the user's experience into the design of new machines." Use of the term in relation to computer software also pre-dates Norman.

== Influences on user experience ==
Many factors can influence a user's experience with a system. To address the variety, factors influencing user experience have been classified into three main categories: the user's state and previous experience, system properties, and the usage context (situation). Understanding representative users, working environments, interactions, and emotional reactions helps in designing the system during User experience design.

== Momentary emotion or overall user experience ==
Single experiences influence the overall user experience: the experience of a key click affects the experience of typing a text message, the experience of typing a message affects the experience of text messaging, and the experience of text messaging affects the overall user experience with the phone. The overall user experience is not simply a sum of smaller interaction experiences, because some experiences are more salient than others. Overall user experience is also influenced by factors outside the actual interaction episode: brand, pricing, friends' opinions, reports in the media, etc.

One branch of user experience research focuses on emotions. This includes momentary experiences during interaction: designing effective interaction and evaluating emotions. Another branch is interested in understanding the long-term relationship between user experience and product appreciation. The industry sees a good overall user experience with a company's products as critical for securing brand loyalty and enhancing the growth of the customer base. All temporal levels of user experience (momentary, episodic, and long-term) are important, but the methods to design and evaluate these levels can be very different.

== Critiques and ethical debates in user experience ==
While user experience has become an essential part of design and product development, it has also attracted criticism and ethical scrutiny. Focusing on user satisfaction and business goals may lead to harmful design choices, unintentional accessibility gaps, or user manipulation. These conflicts suggest that UX has room to become a more responsible and inclusive practice.

=== Profit versus people ===
One major critique of UX is the conflict between designing for user benefit and designing for business objectives. UX decisions are often shaped by financial incentives rather than users’ well-being. This leads to design choices that prioritize growth over ethics, for example, features that encourage excessive screen time, collect unnecessary personal data (also known as privacy zuckering), or make it difficult for users to unsubscribe from services (also known as forced continuity). While trying to increase profits, it may actually increase economic harm and reduce market efficiency. Critics argue that such practices compromise the foundational goal of UX, which is to improve the user's experience, not exploit it.

Companies can be held accountable for their design choices by prioritizing user interests. For instance, ensuring price transparency helps users make informed decisions. Organizations can also align design decisions with user well-being by evaluating qualitative outcomes, like how a product contributes to users’ happiness or mental health, instead of relying solely on engagement metrics. By making business success dependent on user trust and satisfaction, rather than engagement metrics alone, organizations can create sustainable products that support both profitability and user well-being.

=== Dark patterns and manipulative design ===
Another major ethical concern in UX is the use of dark patterns, interface designs that intentionally mislead or manipulate users into taking actions they might not otherwise choose. Examples include use of checkboxes to opt out rather than opt in (double negatives), confusing cancellation processes, or “confirm” buttons that lead to unintended purchases. Scholars from Princeton and Purdue University have argued that dark patterns represent a misuse of UX principles, using psychological insights and interface design against user interests.

One proposed solution to the problem of dark patterns is to focus on how to distinguish manipulative patterns from legitimate persuasion. For example, researchers at Princeton suggest using guidelines to evaluate when a design crosses the line into manipulation. Researchers from Purdue University instead argue that ethical awareness cannot rely solely on codes of conduct but should instead focus on the designer’s intent, judgment, and ongoing responsibility.

=== Inclusivity and accessibility gaps ===
Another area of criticism concerns accessibility and inclusivity in UX design. Although improving usability is a central aim of UX, many products and services continue to overlook the needs of people with disabilities, older users, or those from different cultural and linguistic backgrounds. This exclusion can occur due to implicit bias in design teams, lack of diverse user testing, or assumptions about “average” users.

To address these gaps, experts recommend adopting inclusive design principles throughout the development process. This includes conducting accessibility audits, following the Web Content Accessibility Guidelines (WCAG), and involving users with disabilities in usability testing to ensure products meet real-world needs. Expanding user research to include diverse groups can also uncover assumptions and biases early. Additionally, ongoing education about unconscious bias for design teams can help create products that reflect a broader range of user experiences.

== Developer experience ==
Developer experience (DX) is a user experience from a developer's point of view. It is defined by the tools, processes, and software that a developer uses when interacting with a product or system while in the process of producing another one, such as in software development. DX has had increased attention paid to it, especially in businesses that primarily offer software as a service to other businesses, where ease of use is a key differentiator in the market.

== See also ==
- Chief experience officer
- Content strategy
- Customer experience
- Expectation
- Hick's law
- Human factors and ergonomics
- Interaction design
- Interaction design pattern
- Responsive web design
- Usability
- User-centered design
- User experience design
- User experience evaluation
- User interface design
- User research
- Online to offline
