= User research =

Process of understanding a design's impact on an audience

User research is the investigation to understand user behaviors, needs and motivations through interviews, surveys, usability evaluations and other forms of feedback methodologies. It is used to understand how people interact with products and evaluate whether design solutions meet their needs. This field of research aims at improving the user experience (UX) of products, services, or processes by incorporating experimental and observational research methods to guide the design, development, and refinement of a product. User research is used to improve a multitude of products like websites, mobile phones, medical devices, banking, government services and many more. It is an iterative process that can be used at anytime during product development and is a core part of user-centered design.

Data from users can be used to identify a problem for which solutions may be proposed. From these proposals, design solutions are prototyped and then tested with the target user group even before launching the product in the market. This process is repeated as many times as necessary. After the product is launched in the market, user research can also be used to understand how to improve it or create a new solution. User research also helps to uncover problems faced by users when they interact with a product and turn them into actionable insights. User research is beneficial in all stages of product development from ideation to market release.

Mike Kuniavsky further notes that it is "the process of understanding the impact of design on an audience." The types of user research you can or should perform will depend on the type of site, system or app you are developing, your timeline, and your environment. Professionals who practice user research often use the job title 'user researcher'. User researchers are becoming very common especially in the digital and service industries, even in the government. User researchers often work alongside designers, engineers, and programmers in all stages of product development.

== Purpose ==
With respect to user research in the field of design, research is typically approached with an empathetic perspective in order to humanize data collected about people. This method can also be referred to a human-centred approach to problem-solving. User researcher aims to uncover the barriers or frustrations users face as they interact with products, services, or systems. A unique facet of user research is the brand of user experience (UX) research which focuses on the feelings, thoughts, and situations users go through as they interact with products, services, and systems. Many businesses focus on creating enjoyable experiences for their users; however, not including users in their development process can result in failed products. Involving users in the development process helps design better products, adapt products to change in behaviors and needs, and design the right products and desirable experiences for the users. User research helps businesses and organizations improve their products and services by helping them better understand:

- Who their users are;
- What their users are trying to achieve/ what their needs are;
- How do their users currently try to do things, and what are the current pain points;
- What is the best way to help users achieve their tasks.

There are various benefits to conducting user research more than just designing better products and services. Understanding what people want before releasing products in the market will help save money. Additionally, user research helps to gather data that can help influence stakeholders' decisions based on evidence and not opinions.

== Applications ==
User research is interrelated with the field of design. In many cases, someone working in the field can take on both roles of researcher and designer. Alternatively, these roles may also be separated and teams of designers and researchers must collaborate through their projects. User research is commonly used in:

- Software development
- User experience design

== Types of User Research ==
There is pure and applied research, user research utilizes applied research to make better products. There are many ways of classifying research, Erika Hall in her book Just Enough Research mentions four ways of classifying user research.

=== Generative or exploratory research ===
Generative research or exploratory research is done to understand and define the problems to solve for users in the first place. It can be used during the initial stages of product development to create new solutions or it can be applied to an existing product to identify improvements and enhancements. Interviews, observational studies, secondary research, etc., are some of the common methods used during this phase. These methods are used to answer broad and open questions, where the aim is to identify problems users might be experiencing. Usually, the data collected through generative research must be synthesized in order to formulate the problems to be solved, for whom and why it is important.

=== Descriptive or explanatory research ===
Descriptive research or explanatory research helps to define the characteristics of the problem and populations previously identified. It is used to understand the context of the problem and the context in which users have the problem. The methods in this phase can be very similar to the methods used in the generative research phase. However, this phase helps to identify what is the best way to solve a problem as opposed to what problem to solve. During this phase, experts in the problem area are consulted to fill knowledge gaps that will be required to create a solution. This phase is required to avoid making assumptions about the problem or people that might otherwise result in a biased solution. The aim of this phase is to get a good understanding of the problem, to get the right solution ideas.

=== Evaluative research ===
Evaluative research is used to test the solution ideas to ensure they work and solve the problems identified. Ideas are usually tested by representatives from the target population. This is an iterative process and can be done on prototype versions of the solution. The commonly used method in this phase is called usability testing and it focuses on measuring if the solution addressed the intended problem. Users can also be asked to provide their subjective opinion about the solution, or they can be given a set of tasks to observe if the solution is intuitive and easy to use. In simple words, evaluative research assesses whether the solution fits the problem and whether the right problems were addressed.

=== Causal research ===
Causal research typically answers why something is happening. Once the solution is up and running, one can observe how people are using it in real time and understand why it is or isn't used the way the solution was envisioned. One of the common methods used in this phase is A/B testing.

== Tools and methods ==
The user research process follows a traditional iterative design approach that is common to user-centered design and design thinking. User research can be applied anywhere in the design cycle. Typically software projects start conducting user research at the requirement gathering stage to involve users right from the start of the projects. There are various design models that can be used in an organization, they include a wide range of research methods are used in the field of user research. The Nielsen Norman group has provided a framework to better understand when to use which method, it is helpful to view them along a 3-dimensional framework with the following axes:

- Attitudinal vs. behavioral: This distinction is the contrast between what people say and what people do. Attitudinal research is used to study users' perceptions, beliefs, opinions and what they think about a certain product or problem. Whereas, behavioral research measures how people really use a product. Interview studies, focus groups, surveys and diary studies often measure attitudes. Some usability studies that look how people use products can fall under behavioral research. Web analytics and click rates provide a good behavioral measure.
- Qualitative vs. quantitative: Qualitative research help generate data by asking users about their attitudes through open ended questions via surveys, interviews, and observing behaviors directly. Quantitative research aims to measure attitudes and behaviors via surveys and analytics. The contrast lies in the ability to analyze data, quantitative research typically use mathematical analysis where the instrument of data collection gathers data that can be coded numerically whereas in qualitative research analysis is not mathematical. Affinity diagramming, thematic analysis, grounded theory, are some commonly used qualitative analysis methods.
- Context of use: This describes how participants are using the product in question and whether they are using it in the first place. Products can be used in a natural or near natural setting where there is minimum interference from the researchers and this method provides data with great validity but lacks the ability to ask clarifying questions to users. Scripted use of the product are typically used in lab based or usability studies where the goal is to test or know about very specific aspects of the product. Some exploratory studies like interviews are done when a product does not exist yet or users' perception about a product is gathered when the product in question is not in use.

=== Qualitative methods ===
List of common qualitative user research methods
Method	Description	Context of Product use
User Interviews	It is a qualitative method where the researcher interviews individual participants to learn about a topic of interest. Usually, user interviews are conducted on a one-on-one basis.	Not using product
Guerilla testing	This method collects data in short sessions focused on specific tasks. Participants aren't recruited before the session but are approached in various settings on similar topics focussed by the team.	Scripted use
Focus Groups	In this research method, researchers bring together a small group of people to take part in an interactive discussion in a moderated context. The participants usually have a certain aspect in common such as demographic, interest, etc.	Not using product
Participatory Design	It is a democratic approach for designing social and technological systems that incorporate human activity, based on the idea that users should be involved in the designs they will use, and that all stakeholders, including and especially users, should have equal input into interaction design.	Scripted or Natural use
Diary studies	A diary study is a type of research that collects qualitative data over time regarding user behaviors, activities, and experiences. Participants in a diary study self-report data longitudinally, that is, over a period of time that can range from a few days to a month or longer.	Natural use
Card Sorting	Consumers are asked to organize data into logical categories in this research method. Users are given a set of labeled cards and asked to sort and organize them into categories they believe are acceptable. Categories can be defined by the users or defined by the researchers, based on the method used they are called open or closed card-sorting.	Not using product
Usability Studies (moderated/ unmoderated)	Usability studies are used when a product or service has to be evaluated by testing it with the target user group. During usability tests, users perform some tasks set up by the researchers in a natural environment where researchers observe and identify usability issues with the product. Usability studies can be conducted in a lab or remotely and they can also be conducted without the presence of a researcher. This is called unmoderated usability testing.	Scripted use
Ethnographic studies	In ethnographic research, a researcher or a group of researchers observe the behavior of single or multiple participants to observe their actions. They can be either overtly conducted (by informing the participants about the research or covertly conducted (by keeping the participants unaware of the research conditions)	Natural use

=== Quantitative methods ===
List of common quantitative user research methods
Method	Description	Context of Product use
Surveys	Surveys can be both qualitative and quantitative, based on the format of questions used. They are inexpensive and help to reach out to a large group of people at once.	Scripted or Natural use
Eye Tracking	Eye Tracking is used to measure where people are looking, for long they are looking for something, etc., It provides a view of the product to the users' eyes and provides insights into the users' visual attention.	Scripted or Natural use
Web Analytics	The measurement, collecting, analysis, and reporting of web data in order to understand and optimize web usage is known as web analytics. Web analytics is more than just a way of measuring web traffic; it can also be used to conduct business and market research, as well as evaluate and enhance the effectiveness of a website.	Natural use
A/B Testing	A/B testing compares two versions of a product by showing them to users to see which one performs best or which one is preferred best.	Scripted or Natural use
Quantitative Usability testing	Usability testing is a technique used to evaluate a product. This is done by testing it on users. The aim is to give direct input on how real users would use the system. Quantitative measures like a system usability score, user experience questionnaire, etc, can be recorded as a post-task measure.	Scripted use

=== Deliverables ===
User research deliverables helps summarize research and make insights digestible to the audience. There are multiple formats of presenting research deliverables, regardless of the format the deliverable has to be engaging, actionable and cater to the audience. The following are some most common user research deliverables:

- Research reports
- Personas
- Customer/User journey maps
- Mental Model diagrams
- Wireframes
- Storyboards

== ResearchOps ==
In 2018, a group of like-minded professionals in the user research industry called the ResearchOps Community defined a new practice called Research Ops to operationalize user research practice in companies. ResearchOps is similar to DevOps, DesignOps and SalesOps where the goal is to support practitioners by removing some operational tasks from their daily work. The goal of ResearchOps is to enable researchers be efficient in their roles by saving time taken for data collection and processing data for analysis. ResearchOps aims to support researchers in all facets of user research starting from planning, conducting, analyzing, and maintaining user research data. The ResearchOps Community defines it as the people, mechanisms, and strategies that set user research in motion - providing the roles, tools and processes needed to support researchers in delivering and scaling the impact of the craft across an organization. ResearchOps focuses on standardizing research methods across the organization, providing support documentation like scripts, templates, consent forms, etc, to ensure quick application of research, managing participants and recruitment in studies, providing governance, having oversight of research ethics, ensuring research insights are accessible to the organization.

== Ethics in User Research ==
In private companies there are no clear regulations and ethics committee approval when conducting user research, unlike academic research. In 2014, Facebook conducted an emotional contagion experiment where they manipulated the newsfeed of 689,000 users by showing either positive or negative content than the average user. The experiment lasted for a week and Facebook found out that users who were shown positive posts posted more positive content and the users who were shown negative posts posted more sadder content than previously. This study was criticized because the users were not presented with an informed consent and were unaware that they were a part of the experiment. However, this study seemed to be legal under Facebook's terms and conditions because Facebook's users relinquish the use of their data for data analysis, testing and research. The criticism was mainly due to the manipulative nature of the study, harm caused to the participants who were shown negative content and a lack of explicit informed consent. Since then, Facebook has an Institutional review board (IRB), however, not all studies undergo an ethics approval.

User Researchers often gather and analyze data from their users, however, such activity does not fall under the legal definition of research according to the U.S. Department of Health and Human Services' requirements for common rule (46.102.l). According to them, the legal definition of research is a "systematic investigation, including research development, testing, and evaluation, designed to develop or contribute to generalizable knowledge". Most of the user research studies do not contribute to generalizable knowledge but companies use the data to improve their products and offerings. Design research organizations like IDEO have compiled a guidebook for conducting ethical design research. Their principles are Respect for users, Responsibility to protect peoples' interests, Honesty in truthful and timely communication. However, there is no official framework or process that exists for ethical approval of user research in companies.

== See also ==
- Customer experience
- Human factors
- Human–computer interaction
- Interaction design
- Service design
- Usability
- User experience design
- User experience evaluation
- User interface
- User-centered design
- Voice of the customer
- Design thinking
