= EGGS Design =

Design agency in Oslo, Norway

EGGS is a design agency founded in Oslo, Norway, in 2012. It specialises in cross-disciplinary design projects where expertise in a diversity of fields is required. With offices in Norway, Brazil, and Denmark, EGGS has created projects across a variety of industrial sectors.

== History ==
The consultancy was founded in Oslo in 2012 through the merging of the established product design agency Kadabra Design and the digital design agency Oslo-D. EGGS has offices in Trondheim, Stavanger, and Oslo in Norway, in São Paulo in Brazil, and opened its fifth office in Copenhagen, Denmark, in 2018.

== Organisational structure ==
The agency is owned by its employees, who work in cross-disciplinary teams with the goal of incorporating clients and end-users in a user-centered design process. More than 80 people with expertise in service design, digital design, UX, interaction design, product design, technology and development, innovation, process facilitation, education, business design, and organisational design combine to deliver projects in a variety of industries, including maritime, marine technology, consumer goods, healthcare, public health care services, IT, finance, oil and energy, banking and finance, transportation, and airport infrastructure and services.

== Design awards ==
A number of EGGS projects have received design awards. The Young Talent Design Award from the Norwegian Design Council, the Red Dot Design Award, and the Norwegian State Design Competition have also been awarded to EGGS.
