= Design prototyping =

Creation and testing of prototypes

In design, design prototyping are the actions that create, test and analyse a prototype according to specified purposes at specific stages of the design process. Prototyping consists of the methods or techniques for making a prototype (for example, rapid prototyping), and it is often regarded as a discrete stage in the design process.

The concept of prototyping in design literature is also related to the concepts of experimentation, and Research through Design.

== Prototyping cycle ==
Prototyping involves an iterative cycle of making, testing and analysing which allows the examination of various aspects of a solution before its future implementation, the anticipation of possible issues, and the making of improvements earlier in the process. This cycle can be portrayed as comprising the following steps:

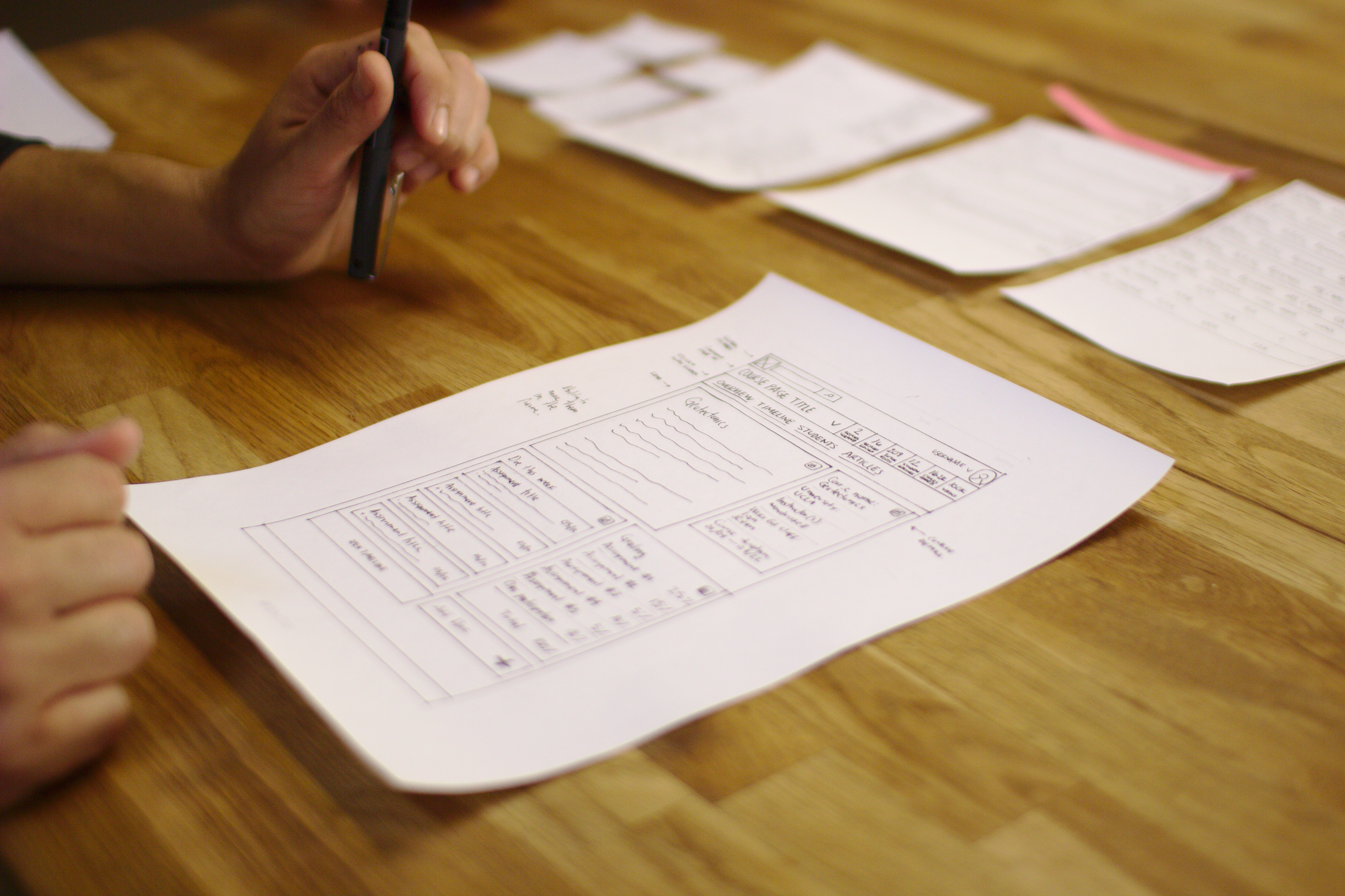
Paper prototype of a website user interface

=== Preparation ===
1. Deciding the goals of prototyping
2. Defining questions and assumptions that are going to be examined
3. Identify the participants of the prototyping sessions and the dimensions of the prototype that are going to be tested

=== Making ===
1. Creating low-fidelity prototypes
  1. Some or various dimensions will be represented in a prototype (e.g., material, form or function). Whilst sketches were previously another category of visual design representations, today they could also be considered as paper prototypes. A low fidelity prototype can be developed with less time and resources than a high-fidelity prototype, with iterations of the former often being developed in the early stages of the making phase.
  2. Steps for creating low-fidelity prototypes in software development may include:
    1. Flowcharts
    2. User behaviour simulation
    3. Wireframing
2. Creating high-fidelity prototypes

=== Testing ===
1. The prototyping session develops in a defined setup with certain characteristics of space and environment and will follow a method to gather feedback

=== Analysing ===
1. The results of the testing will be integrated into the solution and updated in future prototypes

== Characteristics ==
To prepare for prototyping, some aspects need to be decided. For this purpose, it is useful to individualise and consider various characteristics that will allow identifying how prototyping should be developed according to the design needs. In this regard, the prototyping framework proposed by Blomkvist and Holmid could provide some guidelines. As a result of a literature review, they identify a set of characteristics which are:

- Position in the process
- Purpose
- Stakeholer
- Activity
- Prototype

=== Position in the process ===
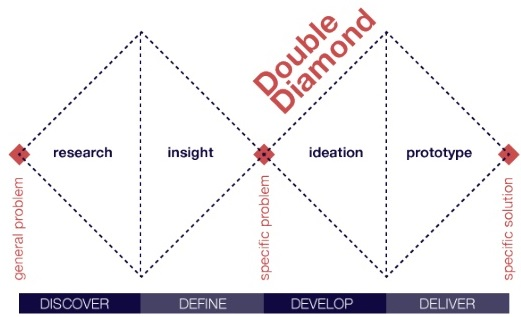
Double Diamond inspired in the Design Council's model of the design process.

Whilst for some scholars prototyping was happening in a particular stage of the design process, the importance of prototyping has been gaining relevance as a continuous activity since the early stages of the process.

=== Purpose ===
Prototyping can be developed according to different aims of the design process that influence decisions such as what variables of the prototype are going to be examined and who is going to be involved in the testing session. For example, in the early stages of the process, the need could be to explore various ideas within the design team and prototypes may be created fast and with little resources, while at the end of the process the functionality of the solution may be evaluated with future users so the prototype would largely resemble its final version.

Some of the purposes of prototyping identified by different authors are:

- Communication: prototyping seeks to support communication and clarification of aspects about the solution with different stakeholders. For instance, it can be used within the design team or by the team to share information, present aspects of a design proposal or persuade stakeholders about the pertinence of a solution. A prototype could be presented internally to other colleagues, managers, or externally to partners, investors, or future users.
- Exploration: prototyping serves to explore different alternatives of solutions or aspects of it, try a variety of ideas, or gather additional insights that feed the ideation process and the generation of new solutions.
- Evaluation: prototyping can be developed to evaluate qualitatively potential solutions or part of them. For instance, it can aid to examine the functionality or the experience of testing it with the future user. The feedback gathered from the evaluation can validate (or not) previous assumptions, help to narrow down alternatives and make decisions about the solution.
- Experimentation: prototyping leads to run an experiment on a prototype to examine in a more technical and quantitative manner the feasibility, efficiency, and specifications of a solution.
- Learning: prototyping is used to gather knowledge about the performance of a prototype and learn about how the solution could work in relation to the user needs.
- Evolution: prototyping could be developed to incrementally improve a prototype until it is refined to get the final solution

=== Stakeholder ===
A prototyping session can involve a variety of people related to the solution. Internal to the organisation, the participants could range from the members of the design team to colleagues from other departments and managers. External to the organisation, prototyping could involve future users and clients, and representatives from other organisations. The selection of the participants would depend on the purposes of prototyping. For instance, a prototyping session for exploration could be developed internally with colleagues in order to get quick feedback about initial design proposals. Another example would be to involve users in co-design prototyping sessions in order to explore proposals directly with future users.

=== Activity ===
The activity refers to the method that would be used for testing a prototype, the context in which it is going to occur, and the strategies for testing in relation to what would be the real conditions of use of the solution.

=== Prototype ===
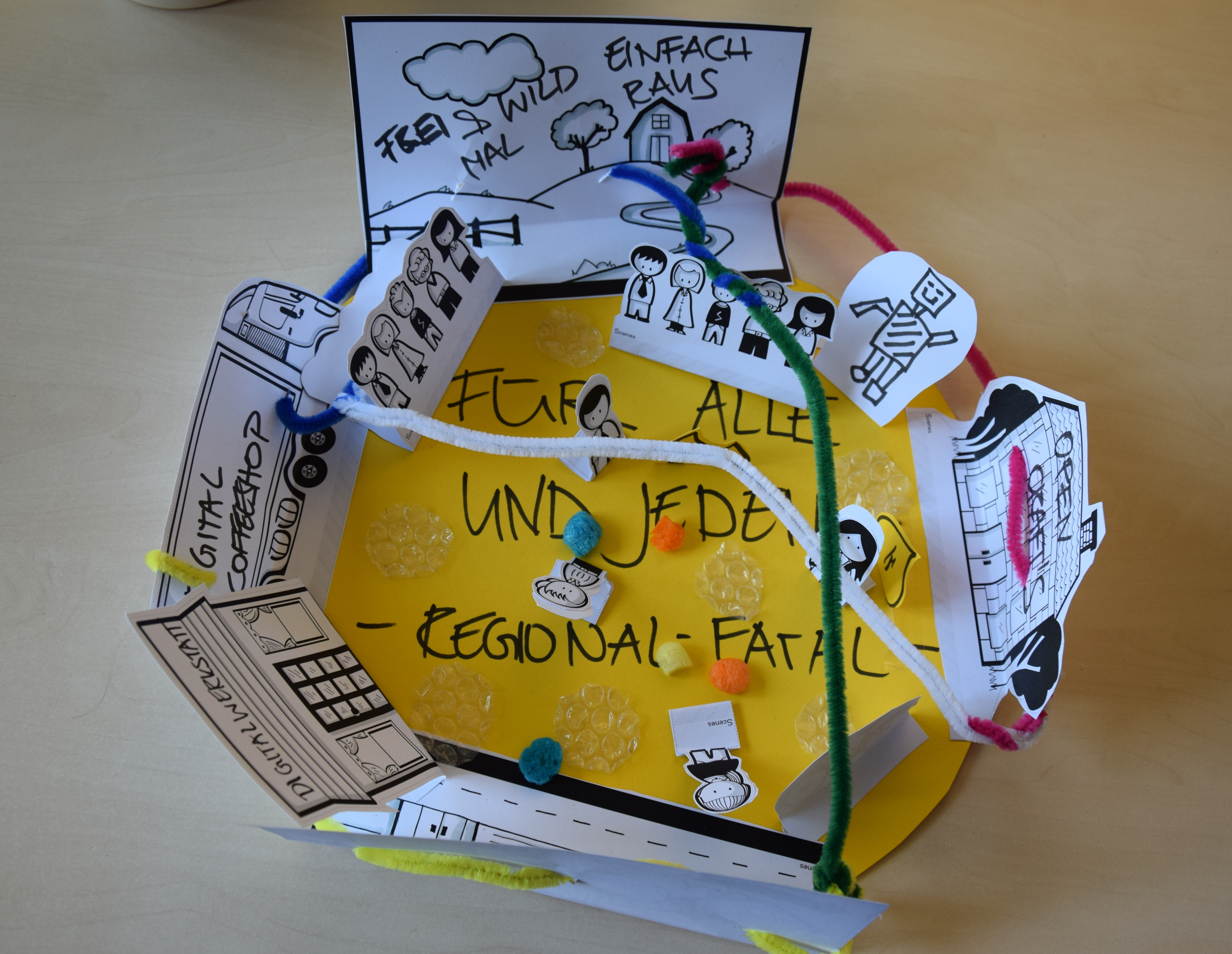
Prototype of a service made with paper illustrations and other simple elements

Prototypes can represent one component of a future solution such as "(Inter)actions, service processes, experiences, physical objects, environments, spaces, architecture, digital artifacts and software, ecosystems, [or] (business) value" or comprise various of these components.

Moreover, a prototype can reflect one or multiple dimensions of the future solution and a variety of aspects could be considered. A simple approach would be to think on the fidelity, meaning how close the prototype resembles to the final solution (blom)(stick). More comprehensive approaches can be considered through multiple dimensions. For instance, Houde and Hill describe the “role” (i.e., functionality for the user), “look and feel” (i.e., sensory, and experiential aspects), “implementation” (i.e., performance of the solution). Lim, Stolterman and Tenenberg propose a classification of prototypes according to “filtering dimensions: functionality, interactivity, and spatial structure"; and “manifestation dimensions:materials, resolution, and scope". They suggest these dimensions can be pondered in order to decide how the prototype should be.

"The best prototype is one that, in the simplest and the most efficient way, makes the possibilities and limitations of a design idea visible and measurable”

— Lim, Stolterman and Tenenberg, 2008

== Background ==
Initial references to the concept of prototyping in design could be traced to the proceedings of the Conference on Design Methods in 1962:

"As you come down in scale, it is much more likely that you will be able to mass produce the object, and therefore be able to make a prototype, test it and try it out and explore it."

— J.K. Page

In 1968, Bruce Archer, a figure in the design methods movement describes the design process as comprising multiple stages, including "Prototype development". From a design methods' perspective, prototyping recalls a process in which a prototype is built, tried out and tested. Additional references to prototyping can be found in later editions of the Design Research Society's Conferences.

One of the first documented uses of the term prototyping, as being linked to a design process, appears in the 1983 software development article, A systematic look at prototyping. Around the year 1990, the availability of methods for rapidly manufacturing models and prototypes stimulated the publication of a great body of literature dedicated to rapid prototyping techniques and technologies (e.g., 3D printing). Technologies for additive manufacturing (i.e., adding material) or substractive manufacturing (i.e., removing material) together with the use of software for computer-aided design (CAD), leveraged prototype building but also the fabrication of products in limited numbers.

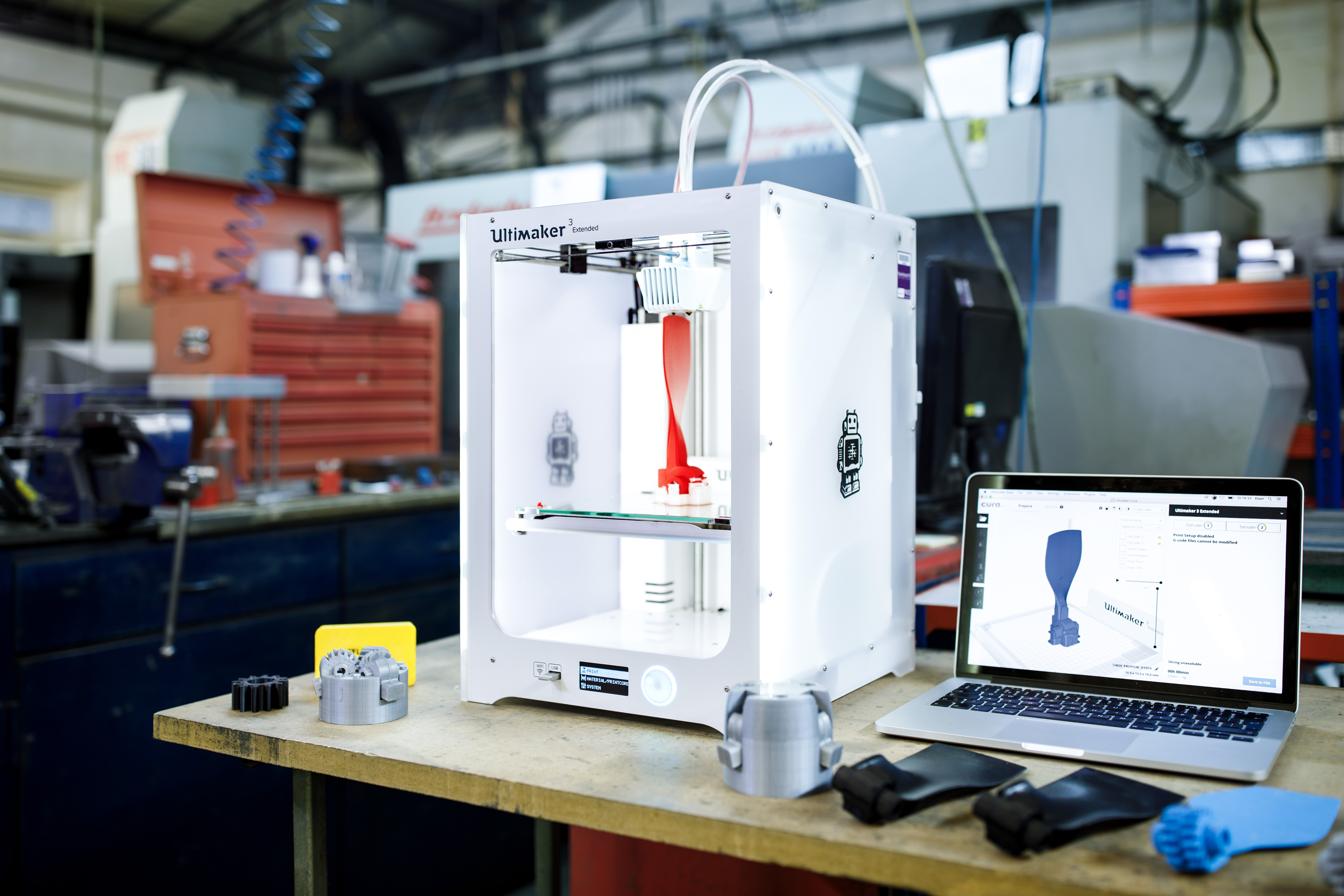
Example of a rapid prototyping technique: 3D printing of prototypes

Along the years, further efforts have been dedicated to characterising prototyping in design disciplines in the fields of interaction design, experience design, product design and service design, as well as in product-design-related fields such as engineering/mechanical design. In 2000, designers from IDEO described experience prototyping, introducing types of design representations and methods that allow simulating aspects of an interaction that people experience by themselves.

Around the year 2010, studies were developed to examine the prototyping of services theorising from the growing practice of service design, which later in 2018 were also used as a reference for service design practitioners.

== See also ==
- Interaction design
- User experience design
- Product design
- Service design
- Software prototyping
- Participatory design - co-design
