= Service design =

Type of design

Service design is the activity of planning and arranging people, infrastructure, communication, and material components of a service in order to improve its quality and the interaction between the service provider and its users. Service design may function as a way to inform users of changes to an existing service or create a new service entirely.

The purpose of service design methodologies is to establish the most effective practices for designing services, according to both the needs of users and the competencies and capabilities of service providers. Service design is successful when the service is user-friendly and relevant to the users, and is also sustainable and competitive for the service provider. For this purpose, service design uses methods and tools derived from different disciplines, ranging from ethnography and information science to management science and interaction design.

Service design concepts and ideas are typically portrayed visually using different representation techniques according to the culture, skill, and level of understanding of the stakeholders involved in the service processes. As emerging technologies associated with the Fourth Industrial Revolution have developed, the significance of service design has increased, as it is believed to facilitate a more feasible productization of these new technologies into the market.

== Definition ==
Service design practice is the specification and construction of processes which deliver valuable capacities for action to a particular user. Service design practice can be both tangible and intangible, and can involve artifacts or other elements such as communication, environment and behavior. Several of the authors of service design theory, including Pierre Eiglier, Richard Normann, and Nicola Morelli, have proposed that services come into existence at the moment they are both provided and used. While a designer can prescribe the exact configuration of a product, they cannot prescribe the result of the interaction between users and service providers in the same way, nor can they prescribe the form and characteristics of any emotional value produced by the service.

Consequently, service design is an activity that, among other things, suggests behavioral patterns or "scripts" for the actors interacting in the service. Understanding how these patterns connect and support each other are important aspects of the character of design and service. This allows greater user freedom and makes the provider more adaptable to the users' needs.

=== Scope and characteristics ===
Service design is the process of creating and improving services to meet the needs and expectations of customers.

Service design has many diverse definitions as it is ever-evolving in nature.

Service design involves creating a service concept that defines the customer's experience, as well as the physical, human, and technological resources required to deliver the service. It focuses on the experience, including customer interactions, service delivery, and support processes.

== History ==
=== Early service design and theory ===
Early contributions to service design were made by G. Lynn Shostack, a bank and marketing manager and consultant, in the form of written articles and books. The activity of designing a service was considered to be part of the domain of marketing and management disciplines in the early years. For instance, in 1982, Shostack proposed the integration of the design of material components (products) and immaterial components (services). This design process, according to Shostack, can be documented and codified using a service blueprint to map the sequence of events in a service and its essential functions in an objective and explicit manner. A service blueprint is an extension of a user journey map, and this document specifies all the interactions a user has with an organization throughout their user life cycle.

Servicescape is a model developed by B. H. Booms and Mary Jo Bitner to focus upon the impact of the physical environment in which a service process takes place and to explain the actions of people within the service environment, with a view to designing environments which accomplish organizational goals in terms of achieving desired responses.

=== Timeline ===
In 1988, service design was first introduced by Vandermerwe and Rada, and since then, it has been debated within multiple research fields. In 2004, the Service Design Network was launched by Köln International School of Design, Carnegie Mellon University, Linköpings Universitet, Politecnico di Milano, and Domus Academy in order to create an international network for service design academics and professionals.

In 2001, Livework, the first service design and innovation consultancy, opened for business in London. In 2003, Engine, initially founded in 2000 in London as an ideation company, positioned themselves as a service design consultancy.

== Principles ==
=== The Five Service Design Principles ===
The article "Service design: a critical examination and future research directions in servitization literature" by Cardoso et al. (2024) proposes five service design pillars:

1. User-centered: Services should be experienced through the customer's eyes.
2. Co-creative: All stakeholders should be included in the service design process.
3. Sequencing: The service should be visualized as a sequence of interrelated actions.
4. Evidencing: Intangible services should be visualized in terms of physical artifacts.
5. Holistic: The entire environment of a service should be considered.

=== Descriptions of principles ===
==== User-centered ====
In the 2011 book, This is Service Design Thinking: Basics, Tools, Cases, the first principle is "user-centered." User refers to any user of the service system, including customers and employees. Thus, the authors revised user-centered to human-centered in their 2018 book, This is Service Design Doing, to clarify that human includes service providers, customers, and all other relevant stakeholders. For instance, in the retail industry, service design must consider not only the customer experience, but also the interests of all relevant people.

==== Co-Creative ====
The second principle, "co-creative," outlines how all stakeholders should be integrating resources to deliver value in services. It also combines two sub-principles, "collaborative" and "iterative," that derive from the principle "co-creative" in This is Service Design Thinking. The service exists with the participation of users, and is created by a group of people from different backgrounds. In most cases, people tend to focus only on the meaning of collaborative, stressing the co-operative and interdisciplinary nature of service design, but ignore the caveat that a service only exists with the participation of a user. Therefore, in the definition of new service design principles, the co-creative pillar is divided into two sub-principles of "collaborative" and "iterative." "Collaboration" is used to indicate the process of creation by the entire stakeholders from different backgrounds. "Iteration" is used to describe service design as an iterating process, continually evolving to adapt to the change in business posture.

==== Sequencing ====
The third principle, "sequencing," helps determine the timeline of a service blueprint. Service design is a dynamic process over a period of time. The timeline is important for users in the service system and sequencing helps organizations map their service development process with a sequence of actions. For example, when a customer shops online, the first information displayed should be the regions where the products can be delivered. In this way, if the customer finds that the products cannot be delivered to their region, they will not continually browse the products on the website. The sequencing in this example would be the steps the organization took to ensure the user was optimized and got the information they needed at the forefront of the website.

==== Evidencing ====
The fourth principle, "evidencing," is a key aspect to implementing a successful optimized approach to service design by making the service design process "evident." For example, when people order food in a restaurant, they cannot perceive the various attributes of the food. If we play the cultivation and picking process of vegetables in the restaurant, people can perceive the intangible services in the backstage, such as the cultivation of organic vegetables, and get a quality service experience. This service also helps the restaurant establish a natural and organic brand image to customers.

==== Holistic ====
The fifth principle of service design is "holistic." Thinking in a holistic way is the cornerstone of service design as it considers the entire environment. Holistic thinking needs to consider both intangible and tangible service, and ensure that every moment the user interacts with the service, such moments known as touchpoints, is considered and optimized. Holistic thinking also needs to understand that users have multiple logics to complete an experience process. Such holistic thinking can extend to safe and sustainable concerns, such as Safe and Sustainable by Design. Thus, a service designer should think about each aspect from different perspectives to ensure that no needs are left unattended-to.

== Methodology ==
Together with the most traditional methods used for product design, service design requires methods and tools to control new elements of the design process, such as the time and the interaction between actors. An overview of the methodologies for designing services was proposed by Nicola Morelli in 2006, who suggested three main directions:

- Identification of the actors involved in the definition of the service by means of appropriate analytical tools.
- Definition of possible service scenarios, verifying use cases, and sequences of actions and actors' roles in order to define the requirements for the service and its logical and organizational structure.
- Representation of the service by means of techniques that illustrate all the components of the service, including physical elements, interactions, logical links and temporal sequences.

In addition to these methodology directions, service design continues to use participatory and engaging methods that include users directly in the creation of scenarios and service concepts. Kankainen et al. (2011) shows that collaborative storytelling sessions help participants to imagine future service scenarios and situations while reflecting on their own experiences. This methodology improves our understanding of user motivations, emotional and personal responses, and expectations in ways that that compliment analytical methods.

Analytical tools refer to anthropology, social studies, ethnography, and social construction of technology. Appropriate elaborations of those tools have been proposed with video-ethnography. Other methods, such as cultural probes, have been developed in the design discipline, which aim to capture information on users in their context of use (Gaver, Dunne et al. 1999; Lindsay and Rocchi 2003).

Design tools aim at producing a blueprint of the service, which describes the nature and characteristics of the interaction in the service. Design tools include service scenarios (which describe the interaction) and use cases (which illustrate the detail of time sequences in a service encounter). Both techniques are already used in software and systems engineering to capture the functional requirements of a system. However, when used in service design, they have been adequately adapted to include more information concerning material and immaterial components of a service, as well as time sequences and physical flows. Crowdsourced information has been shown to be highly beneficial in providing such information for service design purposes, particularly when the information has either a very low or very high monetary value. Other techniques, such as IDEF0, just in time and total quality management are used to produce functional models of the service system and to control its processes. However, such tools may prove too rigid to describe services in which users are supposed to have an active role because of the high level of uncertainty related to the user's behavior.

Given that communication between users and designers is important to service design, modern approaches emphasize collaborative techniques. Kankainen et al. (2011) describe the Storytelling Group, which is a co-design technique where users, designers and other participants work together to create fictional customer journeys using storytelling. Co-design methods, like the Storytelling Group, help expand situation based approaches by allowing users to participate in the creation of service narratives, which makes scenario development more realistic based on real world customer experiences. These narratives follow a timeline and combine imaginary future scenarios with members' real life experiences with the service. This approach shows explicit, underlying, and unseen user needs that may or may not be obvious through just observing or interviews alone, as well as how services evolve across multiple channels and customer relationships.

== Standards ==
In the United Kingdom, British Standard BS 7000-3:1994, part of the BS 7000 – Design management systems series, covers service design.

Recent research shows that design management standards have changed significantly since the publication of BS 7000-3. Grosse et al. (2023) highlight that the move from Industry 4.0 to Industry 5.0 is increasingly shaping modern standards, with an emphasis on human-centered, ethical, and sustainable principles. Rather than relying on efficiency, the new service design standards look to support and promote employee well-being, social responsibility, and collaborative creation. This change connects service design practice with larger international movements towards human driven design.

Additional research by Haghnazar et al. (2024) also supports this change by pointing out that Industry 5.0 puts a heavy focus on being human-centered, sustainable, and resilient in production systems. They argue that future design standards need to take into account reduced material waste, circular bioeconomy principles, and more adaptive and customized production methods.

The article's overview of Industry 5.0 shows that modern standards are becoming more focused on renewable materials, reduced carbon emissions, and design methods that involve human safety and well-being, which is in line with the larger global expectations for sustainable design.

These developments show that service design standards are no longer just limited to technical management frameworks, but increasingly include social and organizational factors that reflect and embody global expectations for ethical and sustainable service delivery.

== Public-sector service design ==
Public sector service design is associated with civic technology, open government, and e-government, and can constitute either government-led or citizen-led initiatives. The public sector is the part of the economy composed of public services and public enterprises. Public services include public goods and governmental services such as the military, police, infrastructure (public roads, bridges, tunnels, water supply, sewers, electrical grids, telecommunications, etc.), public transit, public education, along with health care, and those working for the government itself, such as elected officials. Due to new investments in hospitals, schools, cultural institutions, and security infrastructures in the last few years, the public sector has expanded in many countries. The number of jobs in public services has also grown; such growth can be associated with the large and rapid social change that is in itself a trigger for fresh design. In this context, some governments are considering service design as a means to bring about better-designed public services. Recent scholarship identifies services design as a key driver of public sector modernization. Tsotsas and Fragidis (2024) describe service design as a human centered and participatory approach that helps governments make services more efficient, democratic, and adaptable. Their research highlights that design thinking and service design can improve collaboration between public employees and citizens, while increasing transparency, and promoting co-creation of public value. At the same time, they note persistent barriers, such as bureaucratic rigidity, limited funding, resistance to experimentation, and the tension between personalization and equality in public service delivery. Common tools used in public sector design include citizen-journey mapping, co-design workshops, visualization and mapping techniques, and observational research, which all aim to make public services more responsive to citizens' needs.

=== Denmark ===
In 2002, MindLab, an innovation public sector service design group, was established by the Danish ministries of Business and Growth, Employment, and Children and Education. MindLab was one of the world's first public sector design innovation labs, and their work inspired the proliferation of similar labs and user-centered design methodologies deployed in many countries worldwide. The design methods used at MindLab are typically an iterative approach of prototyping and testing, to evolve not just their government projects, but also the government's organizational structure using ethnographic-inspired user research, creative ideation processes, and visualization and modelling of service prototypes. In Denmark, design within the public sector has been applied to a variety of projects, including rethinking Copenhagen's waste management, improving social interactions between convicts and guards in Danish prisons, transforming services in Odense for mentally disabled adults, and more.

=== United Kingdom ===
In 2007 and 2008, documents from the British government explored the concept of "user-driven public services" and scenarios of highly personalized public services. The documents proposed a new view on the role of service providers and users in the development of new and highly customized public services, employing user involvement methods. While this approach has been explored through an early initiative in the UK, the possibilities of service design for the public sector are also being researched, picked up, and promoted in European Union countries including Belgium.

More recently, analyses suggest that design thinking has continued to influence UK public Policy, particularly through initiatives like the Government Digital Service (GDS) and Policy Lab. These efforts are applying service design methods, such as prototyping, journey mapping, and co-design to enhance digital inclusion and accessibility in government services. Scholars link these developments to broader international trends which are identified by Tsotsas and Fragidis (2024), who argue that service design offers governments a framework for adaptive governance and participatory decision making.

More research has expanded the understanding of how service design functions within the UK public sector organization. Turner (2025) conducted an ethnographic study of Royal Mail during the introduction of competition in the postal markets, which examined two cross-functional projects involving external design agencies. In shaping service design through multiple-level factors which included workplace social practices, organizational restructuring, and power relations, these factors influenced the ideas to be legitimized. In the study conducted by Turner (2025), it argues that successful service design requires organizational absorptive capacity, which is the ability to recognize, interpret and apply new knowledge, alongside design methods like prototyping and co-creation. This suggests that design-led public sector reform depends not just on service design tools or the techniques but on internal collaboration and organizational readiness for change.

The Behavioural Insights Team (BIT) was originally established under the auspices of the Cabinet Office in 2010, in order to apply nudge theory to try to improve UK government policy interventions and save money. In 2014, BIT was 'spun-out' to become a company allied to Nesta, BIT employees and the UK government, with each owning a third of this new business. That same year a Nudge unit referred to as the 'US Nudge Unit' was added to the United States government under President Obama, working within the White House Office of Science and Technology Policy.

=== New Zealand ===
In recent years, New Zealand has seen a significant increase in the use of Service Design approaches and methods applied to challenges faced by the public sector. One instance of service design approaches being applied is with the Family 100 project which focused on the experiences of families living in urban poverty in Auckland. A report, "Speaking for Ourselves", and a companion empathy tool, "Demonstrating the Complexities of Being Poor: An Empathy Tool", were released in July 2014. The report and empathy tool were released as the result of a collective service design effort by the Auckland Council, Auckland City Mission, ThinkPlace (a Service Design consultancy), as well as researchers from University of Waikato, Massey University, and the University of Auckland. Since its release, the report has been used as a reference in discussions on urban poverty and public-sector service design in New Zealand.

Similar participatory design practices have since expanded across the Asia-Pacific region, aligning with global trends towards citizen-centered and co-created public services identified by Tsotsas and Fragidis (2024).

== Private-sector service design ==
Real-world service design work can be experienced as new and useful approaches as well as entail some challenges in practice, as identified in field research.

A practical example of service design thinking can be found at the Myyrmanni shopping mall in Vantaa, Finland. The management attempted to improve the customer flow to the second floor as there were queues at the landscape lifts and the KONE steel car lifts were ignored. To improve customer flow to the second floor of the mall, KONE implemented their "people flow" service design thinking by turning the elevators into a hall of fame for The Incredibles comic strip characters; making their elevators more attractive to the public solved the people flow problem. This case of service design thinking by KONE is used in literature as an example of extending products into services.

== In health care ==
Clinical service redesign is an approach to improving quality and productivity in health care. A redesign is ideally clinically led and involves all stakeholders (e.g. primary and secondary care clinicians, senior management, patients, commissioners etc.) to ensure national and local clinical standards are set and communicated across the care settings. By following the patient's journey or pathway, the team can focus on improving both the patient experience and the outcomes of care.

Effective healthcare must be evaluated to determine whether current service design impacts access, affordability, and usability. That evaluation should then be used to influence redesign needs and determine how they can be improved. Evaluation is necessary also to determine if structural designs and implementation designs should be incorporated to combat possible issues of healthcare quality, access, patient satisfaction, and cost efficiency. Aly et al. (2018) explain that service design in healthcare should consider affordability and eligibility to ensure that there is fair and equitable access to care.

The implementation of service designs in healthcare should look at ensuring long-term sustainability and growth of the designs. Service designs and redesigns should look to emphasize multiple stages of implementation, specifically increased collaboration processes. Aly et al. (2018) explain how this multi-stage implementation requires coordination across pharmacies, primary care services, and policymakers. They state that proper training and official communication pathways throughout healthcare teams are essential to ensure properly coordinated care and successful design.

Aly et al. (2018) state that service design should be tailored to local needs. These designs should consider specific population needs, the current local healthcare systems, and the existing workflows to ensure that service designs remain relevant and successful. Further, they explain the importance of community-based healthcare, they specifically looked at pharmacies who offer minor ailment services, as they can improve access to and reduce the strain on general practitioners and emergency services.

== See also ==
- Chief experience officer
- Operations management
- Service recovery
- Service science, management and engineering
- Service-dominant logic
