= Safe and Sustainable by Design =

Innovation approach

Safe and Sustainable by Design or SSbD is an approach that integrates safety and sustainability considerations into the design and development of substances, materials, products, processes, and systems, aiming to minimize negative impacts on the environment and human health throughout their entire lifecycle. It is an iterative process that focuses on proactively creating solutions that are not only safe but also offer environmental, societal, and/or economic value. SSbD was first introduced in the EU Chemicals Strategy for Sustainability Towards a Toxic-Free Environment, as one of two approaches to better protect health and environment while at the same time encouraging innovation. SSbD is expected to contribute to several Sustainable Development Goals, such as Good Health & Well-being (SDG 3) by reducing exposure to hazardous substances, Industry, Innovation & Infrastructure (SDG 9) by fostering green technology development, Responsible Consumption & Production (SDG 12) by designing for circularity, Climate Action (SDG 13) by reducing greenhouse gas emissions, and Life Below Water and Life on Land (SDG 14 and 15) by minimizing pollution.

== Origin of SSbD ==
Safe by Design was introduced many decades ago, initially to efficiently protect workers against physical harm. The government of the Netherlands was one of the first to stimulate the application of Safe by Design to replace hazardous chemicals. SSbD is an extension of Safe by design to also include sustainability as to cover the necessary innovation to realise the goals of the European Green Deal.

== Description ==
Safe and Sustainable by Design is a method for developing sustainable substances and materials with the aim of ensuring they do not harm people or the environment.

=== Contribution to societal goals ===
The societal goals of SSbD are:

- Protecting human health, the environment, and nature for current and future generations.
- Creating a circular economy in which materials are reused in a high-quality manner.
- Stimulating innovations and revenue models for a sustainable and competitive chemical sector.

=== Principles ===
The principles of a SSbD development process are:

- Developers incorporate safety and sustainability into the development process from the outset.
- Companies take responsibility for safety and sustainability, regardless of legal requirements.
- Developers explicitly consider the trade-offs between functionality, safety, and sustainability.
- Companies develop substances and materials from sustainably produced recycled or raw materials.
- The substances and materials are safe throughout their entire life cycle and biodegradable or reusable after the end of life.
- Supply chain partners collaborate to continuously improve the safety and sustainability of substances and materials.

=== Pros and cons of SSbD ===
Potential benefits for companies that apply SSbD include:

- Companies are future-proof if they operate socially responsible and stay ahead of laws and regulations.
- Companies have a positive image and are attractive to partners, investors, employees, and consumers.
- SSbD encourages companies to innovate, giving them a competitive advantage.
- Companies discover potential safety risks early on, allowing them to adjust their innovation process.
- Companies reduce the risk of future liability for damage to people and the environment.
- Supply chain partners develop a common language and working method, which promotes collaboration.
- Possible alternatives that are early on assessed as potentially hazardous or unsustainable do not need to be further developed, thus saving costs (fail fast, fail cheap).

Potential disadvantages of applying SSbD include:

- It takes time to build the necessary knowledge, skills, and supply chain collaboration.
- Not all companies have the capacity and resources to invest in SSbD.
- To work according to SSbD and achieve lasting results, a cultural shift is necessary.
- SSbD may require adjustments to production processes and facilities.
- Responsibly developed substances and materials may be more expensive.
- Not all companies succeed in developing a more sustainable and safer alternative with the same functionality.

== Comparison of traditional product development and SSbD ==
Safe and Sustainable by Design differs from the traditional approach to product development by considering safety and environmental impact from after the moment the product has been made to satisfy legislation to an upfront requirement. Traditionally development focuses mostly on functionality and cost, which may lead to the identification of hazards in a late stage or even only after being in use for a long time (e.g., DDT). SSbD on the other hand integrates life-cycle assessment from the start and will mostly result in safer and more circular products and fewer emissions.

== Policies ==
The European Commission has issued a framework that addresses iterative (re-)design and assessment as more data becomes available. During design phase guiding principles should be applied that steer the design choices. During this phase goal, scope and system boundaries are defined that will frame the assessment of the chemical or material. The assessment consists of four elements: determining the potential hazard, calculating possible exposure of workers during fabrication, exposure to downstream users, consumers and environment and life-cycle assessment. This assessment can be applied to newly developed chemicals and materials. But it can also be applied to chemicals and materials already on the market to improve their safety and sustainability performance during all life cycle stages. Horizon Europe, the current EU research and innovation funding programme (2021–2027) supports SSbD through funding, particularly through projects like the Strategic Research and Innovation Plan. The European Commission commissioned a study on providing businesses with support to substitute their use of hazardous chemicals by stimulating supply chain cooperation, innovation, research and direct assistance.

== Guidances ==
The European Chemical Industry Council (Cefic) published in 2024 guidance intended for research and innovation teams within chemical companies to be used in addition to the Framework of the European Commission. It describes a workflow that fits the application of SSbD. The first activity is the alignment of performance and functionality needs in the form of a needs list that includes stakeholder and corporate requirements, intended use and minimum requirements. Next is the identification of the scope of the assessment dimensions including relevant hazards, exposures linked to the intended use, and relevant sustainability dimensions. This is followed by selection of the design principles for each assessment dimension. Then a comparative assessment is performed, creating assessment results by using assessment toolboxes relevant to the selected dimensions and by checking for stakeholder and corporate requirements along the value chain. Finally, trade-offs are evaluated based on a guidance and the optimal solution is selected.
