= Descent direction =

In optimization, a descent direction is a vector $\mathbf{p}\in\mathbb R^n$ that points towards a local minimum $\mathbf{x}^*$ of an objective function $f:\mathbb R^n\to\mathbb R$.

Computing $\mathbf{x}^*$ by an iterative method, such as line search defines a descent direction $\mathbf{p}_k\in\mathbb R^n$ at the $k$th iterate to be any $\mathbf{p}_k$ such that $\langle\mathbf{p}_k,\nabla f(\mathbf{x}_k)\rangle < 0$, where $\langle , \rangle$ denotes the inner product. The motivation for such an approach is that small steps along $\mathbf{p}_k$ guarantee that $\displaystyle f$ is reduced, by Taylor's theorem.

Using this definition, the negative of a non-zero gradient is always a descent direction, as $\langle -\nabla f(\mathbf{x}_k), \nabla f(\mathbf{x}_k) \rangle = -\langle \nabla f(\mathbf{x}_k), \nabla f(\mathbf{x}_k) \rangle < 0$.

Numerous methods exist to compute descent directions, all with differing merits, such as gradient descent or the conjugate gradient method.

More generally, if $P$ is a positive definite matrix, then $p_k = -P \nabla f(x_k)$ is a descent direction at $x_k$. This generality is used in preconditioned gradient descent methods.

== See also ==
- Directional derivative
