= Broyden's method =

Quasi-Newton root-finding method for the multivariable case

In numerical analysis, Broyden's method is a quasi-Newton method for finding roots in k variables. It was originally described by C. G. Broyden in 1965.

Newton's method for solving f(x) = 0 uses the Jacobian matrix, J, at every iteration. However, computing this Jacobian can be a difficult and expensive operation; for large problems such as those involving solving the Kohn–Sham equations in quantum mechanics the number of variables can be in the hundreds of thousands. The idea behind Broyden's method is to compute the whole Jacobian at most only at the first iteration, and to do rank-one updates at other iterations.

In 1979 Gay proved that when Broyden's method is applied to a linear system of size n × n, it terminates in 2 n steps, although like all quasi-Newton methods, it may not converge for nonlinear systems.

== Description of the method ==
=== Solving single-variable nonlinear equation ===
In the secant method, we replace the first derivative f′ at x_{n} with the finite-difference approximation:

$$f'(x_n) \simeq \frac{f(x_n) - f(x_{n-1})}{x_n - x_{n - 1}},$$

and proceed similar to Newton's method:

$$x_{n + 1} = x_n - \frac{f(x_n)}{f^\prime(x_n)}$$

where n is the iteration index.

=== Solving a system of nonlinear equations ===
Consider a system of k nonlinear equations in $k$ unknowns

$$\mathbf f(\mathbf x) = \mathbf 0 ,$$

where f is a vector-valued function of vector x

$$\mathbf x = (x_1, x_2, x_3, \dotsc, x_k),$$
$$\mathbf f(\mathbf x) = \big(f_1(x_1, x_2, \dotsc, x_k), f_2(x_1, x_2, \dotsc, x_k), \dotsc, f_k(x_1, x_2, \dotsc, x_k)\big).$$

For such problems, Broyden gives a variation of the one-dimensional Newton's method, replacing the derivative with an approximate Jacobian J. The approximate Jacobian matrix is determined iteratively based on the secant equation, a finite-difference approximation:

$$\mathbf J_n (\mathbf x_n - \mathbf x_{n - 1}) \simeq \mathbf f(\mathbf x_n) - \mathbf f(\mathbf x_{n - 1}),$$

where n is the iteration index. For clarity, define

$$\mathbf f_n = \mathbf f(\mathbf x_n),$$
$$\Delta \mathbf x_n = \mathbf x_n - \mathbf x_{n - 1},$$
$$\Delta \mathbf f_n = \mathbf f_n - \mathbf f_{n - 1},$$

so the above may be rewritten as

$$\mathbf J_n \Delta \mathbf x_n \simeq \Delta \mathbf f_n.$$

The above equation is underdetermined when k is greater than one. Broyden suggested using the most recent estimate of the Jacobian matrix, J_{n−1}, and then improving upon it by requiring that the new form is a solution to the most recent secant equation, and that there is minimal modification to J_{n−1}:

$$\mathbf J_n = \mathbf J_{n - 1} + \frac{\Delta \mathbf f_n - \mathbf J_{n - 1} \Delta \mathbf x_n}{\|\Delta \mathbf x_n\|^2} \Delta \mathbf x_n^{\mathrm T}.$$

This minimizes the Frobenius norm

$$\|\mathbf J_n - \mathbf J_{n - 1}\|_{\rm F} .$$

One then updates the variables using the approximate Jacobian, what is called a quasi-Newton approach.

$$\mathbf x_{n + 1} = \mathbf x_n - \alpha \mathbf J_n^{-1} \mathbf f(\mathbf x_n) .$$

If $\alpha = 1$ this is the full Newton step; commonly a line search or trust region method is used to control $\alpha$. The initial Jacobian can be taken as a diagonal, unit matrix, although more common is to scale it based upon the first step. Broyden also suggested using the Sherman–Morrison formula to directly update the inverse of the approximate Jacobian matrix:

$$\mathbf J_n^{-1} = \mathbf J_{n - 1}^{-1} + \frac{\Delta \mathbf x_n - \mathbf J^{-1}_{n - 1} \Delta \mathbf f_n}{\Delta \mathbf x_n^{\mathrm T} \mathbf J^{-1}_{n - 1} \Delta \mathbf f_n} \Delta \mathbf x_n^{\mathrm T} \mathbf J^{-1}_{n - 1}.$$

This first method is commonly known as the "good Broyden's method."

A similar technique can be derived by using a slightly different modification to J_{n−1}. This yields a second method, the so-called "bad Broyden's method":

$$\mathbf J_n^{-1} = \mathbf J_{n - 1}^{-1} + \frac{\Delta \mathbf x_n - \mathbf J^{-1}_{n - 1} \Delta \mathbf f_n}{\|\Delta \mathbf f_n\|^2} \Delta \mathbf f_n^{\mathrm T}.$$

This minimizes a different Frobenius norm

$$\|\mathbf J_n^{-1} - \mathbf J_{n - 1}^{-1}\|_{\rm F}.$$

In his original paper Broyden could not get the bad method to work, but there are cases where it does for which several explanations have been proposed. Many other quasi-Newton schemes have been suggested in optimization such as the BFGS, where one seeks a maximum or minimum by finding zeros of the first derivatives (zeros of the gradient in multiple dimensions). The Jacobian of the gradient is called the Hessian and is symmetric, adding further constraints to its approximation.

== The Broyden Class of Methods ==
In addition to the two methods described above, Broyden defined a wider class of related methods. In general, methods in the Broyden class are given in the form
$$\mathbf{J}_{k+1}=\mathbf{J}_k-\frac{\mathbf{J}_k s_k s_k^T \mathbf{J}_k}{s_k^T \mathbf{J}_k s_k}+\frac{y_k y_k^T}{y_k^T s_k}+\phi_k\left(s_k^T \mathbf{J}_k s_k\right) v_k v_k^T,$$
where $y_k := \mathbf{f}(\mathbf{x}_{k+1}) - \mathbf{f}(\mathbf{x}_{k}),$ $s_k := \mathbf{x}_{k+1} - \mathbf{x}_k,$ and
$$v_k = \left[\frac{y_k}{y_k^T s_k} - \frac{\mathbf{J}_k s_k}{s_k^T \mathbf{J}_k s_k}\right],$$
and $\phi_k \in \mathbb{R}$ for each $k = 1, 2, ...$. The choice of $\phi_k$ determines the method.

Other methods in the Broyden class have been introduced by other authors.

- The Davidon–Fletcher–Powell (DFP) method, which is the only member of this class being published before the two methods defined by Broyden. For the DFP method, $\phi_k = 1$.
- Anderson's iterative method, which uses a least squares approach to the Jacobian.
- Schubert's or sparse Broyden algorithm – a modification for sparse Jacobian matrices.
- The Pulay approach, often used in density functional theory.
- A limited memory method by Srivastava for the root finding problem which only uses a few recent iterations.
- Klement (2014) – uses fewer iterations to solve some systems.
- Multisecant methods for density functional theory problems.

== See also ==
- Secant method
- Newton's method
- Quasi-Newton method
- Newton's method in optimization
- Davidon–Fletcher–Powell formula
- Broyden–Fletcher–Goldfarb–Shanno (BFGS) method
