= Symmetric rank-one =

The Symmetric Rank 1 (SR1) method is a quasi-Newton method to update the second derivative (Hessian) based on the derivatives (gradients) calculated at two points. It is a generalization to the secant method for a multidimensional problem. This update maintains the symmetry of the matrix but does not guarantee that the update be positive definite.

The sequence of Hessian approximations generated by the SR1 method converges to the true Hessian under mild conditions, in theory; in practice, the approximate Hessians generated by the SR1 method show faster progress towards the true Hessian than do popular alternatives (BFGS or DFP), in preliminary numerical experiments. The SR1 method has computational advantages for sparse or partially separable problems.

A twice continuously differentiable function $x \mapsto f(x)$ has a gradient ($\nabla f$) and Hessian matrix $B$: The function $f$ has an expansion as a Taylor series at $x_0$, which can be truncated

$$f(x_0+\Delta x) \approx f(x_0)+\nabla f(x_0)^T \Delta x+\frac{1}{2} \Delta x^T {B} \Delta x$$;

its gradient has a Taylor-series approximation also

$$\nabla f(x_0+\Delta x) \approx \nabla f(x_0)+B \Delta x$$,

which is used to update $B$. The above secant-equation need not have a unique solution $B$. The SR1 formula computes (via an update of rank 1) the symmetric solution that is closest to the current approximate-value $B_k$:

$$B_{k+1}=B_{k}+\frac {(y_k-B_k \Delta x_k) (y_k-B_k \Delta x_k)^T}{(y_k-B_k \Delta x_k)^T \Delta x_k}$$,

where

$$y_k=\nabla f(x_k+\Delta x_k)-\nabla f(x_k)$$.

The corresponding update to the approximate inverse-Hessian $H_k=B_k^{-1}$ is

$$H_{k+1}=H_{k}+\frac {(\Delta x_k-H_k y_k)(\Delta x_k-H_k y_k)^T}{(\Delta x_k-H_k y_k)^T y_k}$$.

One might wonder why positive-definiteness is not preserved — after all, a rank-1 update of the form $B_{k+1} = B_k + vv^T$ is positive-definite if $B_k$ is. The explanation is that the update might be of the form $B_{k+1} = B_k - vv^T$ instead because the denominator can be negative, and in that case there are no guarantees about positive-definiteness.

The SR1 formula has been rediscovered a number of times. Since the denominator can vanish, some authors have suggested that the update be applied only if

$$|\Delta x_k^T (y_k-B_k \Delta x_k)|\geq r \|\Delta x_k\|\cdot \|y_k-B_k \Delta x_k\|$$,

where $r\in(0,1)$ is a small number, e.g. $10^{-8}$.

== Limited Memory ==
The SR1 update maintains a dense matrix, which can be prohibitive for large problems. Similar to the L-BFGS method also a limited-memory SR1 (L-SR1) algorithm exists. Instead of storing the full Hessian approximation, a L-SR1 method only stores the $m$ most recent pairs $\{(s_i, y_i) \}_{i=k-m}^{k-1}$, where $\Delta x_i := s_i$ and $m$ is an integer much smaller than the problem size ($m \ll n$). The limited-memory matrix is based on a compact matrix representation

$B_k = B_0 + J_k N^{-1}_k J^T_k, \quad J_k = Y_k-B_0 S_k, \quad N_k = D_k+L_k+L^T_k-S^T_k B_0 S_k$

$$S_k = \begin{bmatrix} s_{k-m} & s_{k-m+1} & \ldots & s_{k-1} \end{bmatrix},$$
$$Y_k = \begin{bmatrix} y_{k-m} & y_{k-m+1} & \ldots & y_{k-1} \end{bmatrix},$$

$\big(L_k\big)_{ij} = s^T_{i-1}y_{j-1}, \quad (D_k)_{ii} = s^T_{i-1}y_{i-1}, \quad k-m \le i \le k-1$

Since the update can be indefinite, the L-SR1 algorithm is suitable for a trust-region strategy. Because of the limited-memory matrix, the trust-region L-SR1 algorithm scales linearly with the problem size, just like L-BFGS.

== See also ==
- Quasi-Newton method
- Broyden's method
- Newton's method in optimization
- Broyden-Fletcher-Goldfarb-Shanno (BFGS) method
- L-BFGS method
- Compact quasi-Newton representation
