= EIS =

Eis or EIS may refer to:

== Education ==
- Eastern Independent Schools of Melbourne, in Australia
- Educational Institute of Scotland, a trade union
- Ekamai International School, in Bangkok, Thailand
- English for Integrated Studies, a program in Thailand
- Escuela Internacional Sampedrana, a school in San Pedro Sula, Honduras
- Essence International School, in Kaduna, Nigeria
- European International School, in Parañaque City, Philippines
- European International School Ho Chi Minh City, in Vietnam

== Government ==
- Enhanced Imaging System, an American satellite program
- Enterprise Investment Scheme, series of UK Tax reliefs
- Epidemic Intelligence Service, a program of the US Centers for Disease Control and Prevention

== Health and medicine ==
- Emergency Infant Services, an American charity
- Estrogen insensitivity syndrome

== People ==
- Egon Eis (1910–1994), Austrian screenwriter
- Frederick Eis (1843–1926), German-American Catholic bishop
- Maria Eis (1896–1954), Austrian actress
- Otto Eis (1903–1952), Austrian-American screenwriter

== Science and technology ==
- Electrochemical impedance spectroscopy
- Electrolyte–insulator–semiconductor sensor
- Electronic image stabilization
- Embryo-carrying interstellar starship, a concept in space colonization
- Enterprise information system
- Eesti Internet SA, the operator of the .ee country code top-level domain of Estonia
- Europa Imaging System
- Evolving intelligent system
- Executive information system
- Extreme Ice Survey
- Extreme-ultraviolet Imaging Spectrometer, an instrument on board the Hinode satellite
- Effective Isotropic Sensitivity

== Other uses ==
- Eis, alternative spelling of ais, Etruscan word meaning 'god'
- Eisbach (Rhine), a river in Germany
- Edmonton International Speedway, in Alberta, Canada
- English Institute of Sport, a network of sports related services
- Environmental impact statement, in the United States
- Expressive Intelligence Studio, a game design research group at University of California, Santa Cruz
- Terrance B. Lettsome International Airport, in the British Virgin Islands
- E♯ (musical note)
