= School of Computer Science and Electronic Engineering, Essex University =

UK academic institution

Coordinates: 51.88333°N 0.9°E

- Former names: Electronic Systems Engineering (1966–2007), Department of Computer Science (1966–2007)
- Established: 2007 (Following a merger of the departments of Computer Science and Electronic Systems Engineering)
- Location: Colchester, United Kingdom
- Campus: University of Essex, Wivenhoe Park, Colchester, CO4 3SQ, United Kingdom
- Website: Essex.ac.uk

The School of Computer Science and Electronic Engineering at the University of Essex is an academic department that focuses on educating and researching into Computer Science and Electronic Engineering specific matters. It was formed by the merger of two departments, notable for being amongst the first in England in their fields, the Department of Electronic Systems Engineering (1966) and the Department of Computer Science (1966).

== Achievements ==
The School/Department is notable for the following achievements:

- The Department's MSc Masters course in Telecommunications was the first one in the world to cover the complete telecommunication system, including both switching and transmission.
- The world's first telephone based system for deaf people to communicate with each other was invented and developed in the department by Don Pearson in 1981. The system was based on sign language - cameras and display devices were able to work within the limited telephone bandwidth to enable sign language communication two decades before the widespread use of broadband and web-cameras.
- The department produced the first MSc on the Theory of Programming Languages (1970; Laski, Turner) called Program Linguistics.
- Charles Broyden in 1970 developed the BFGS method for numerical optimisation. The method is still the industry standard, in constant use around the world after nearly 40 years.

== Current notable research ==
- The Photonics Hyperhighway project began in 2010 and is planned to run until 2016. It was funded by the Engineering and Physical Sciences Research Council (EPSRC) with an aims to focus on energy-efficient ultra high capacity ICT infrastructure. The project plans to make broadband internet 100 times faster including partnership with the BBC to help broadcast ultra high definition content.
- Current research with the UK Research Network on Artificial Intelligence and Video Game technologies into artificial intelligence and Computer Games

== Notable alumni and staff ==
- Richard Bartle, Co-creator of MUD1 (the first Multi-User Dungeon) and author of Designing Virtual Worlds. Lecturer
- Tony Brooker, University's founding Chair of Computer Science 1967.
- Charles George Broyden, a senior lecturer in the department from 1967 to 1970, independently discovered the Broyden–Fletcher–Goldfarb–Shanno (BFGS) method. It has been a key technique in solving optimization problems, while he was also well known for Broyden's methods and Broyden family methods. In 2009, the Charles Broyden Prize was named after him to "honor this remarkable researcher" by Optimization Methods and Software in the international optimization community.
- Riccardo Poli, Major contributor to the field of Genetic Programming. Current lecturer at the university.
- Edward Tsang. known for his work on constraint satisfaction and computational finance* Ray Turner, notable for his work on logic in computer science and for his pioneering work in the philosophy of computer science. Emeritus Professor
- Hani Hagras, notable for his work on Type-2 fuzzy sets and systems, and researcher on Explainable Artificial Intelligence. Currently, he's professor at the school.
- Javier Andreu-Perez, scientist in human-centered AI for health technology and major contributor to the field of AI in healthcare and cognitive neuroscience. Currently he's faculty member at the school.
