= Mairesse =

Mairesse is a surname. Notable people with the surname include:

- Guy Mairesse (1910–1954), French racing driver
- Jacques Mairesse (footballer) (1905–1940), French footballer
- Jacques Mairesse (economist) (born 1940), French economist
- Marceau Mairesse (1945–2026), Belgian politician
- Pierre Mairesse-Lebrun (1912–2003), French Army cavalry officer
- Valérie Mairesse (born 1955), French actress
- Willy Mairesse (1928–1969), Belgian racing driver
