= Compact quasi-Newton representation =

Matrix decomposition

The compact representation for quasi-Newton methods is a matrix decomposition, which is typically used in gradient based optimization algorithms or for solving nonlinear systems. The decomposition uses a low-rank representation for the direct and/or inverse Hessian or the Jacobian of a nonlinear system. Because of this, the compact representation is often used for large problems and constrained optimization.

The compact representation (right) of a dense Hessian approximation (left) is an initial matrix (typically diagonal) plus low rank decomposition. It has a small memory footprint (shaded areas) and enables efficient matrix computations

== Definition ==
The compact representation of a quasi-Newton matrix for the inverse Hessian $H_k$ or direct Hessian $B_k$ of a nonlinear objective function $f(x):\mathbb{R}^n \to \mathbb{R}$ expresses a sequence of recursive rank-1 or rank-2 matrix updates as one rank-$k$ or rank-$2k$ update of an initial matrix. Because it is derived from quasi-Newton updates, it uses differences of iterates and gradients $\nabla f(x_k) = g_k$ in its definition $\{s_{i-1}=x_{i}-x_{i-1},y_{i-1}=g_{i}-g_{i-1} \}_{i=1}^k$. In particular, for $r=k$ or $r=2k$ the rectangular $n \times r$ matrices $U_k, J_k$ and the $r \times r$ square symmetric systems $M_k, N_k$ depend on the $s_i,y_i$'s and define the quasi-Newton representations

$$H_k = H_0 + U_k M^{-1}_k U^T_k, \quad \text{ and } \quad B_k = B_0 + J_k N^{-1}_k J^T_k$$

=== Applications ===
Because of the special matrix decomposition the compact representation is implemented in state-of-the-art optimization software. When combined with limited-memory techniques it is a popular technique for constrained optimization with gradients. Linear algebra operations can be done efficiently, like matrix-vector products, solves or eigendecompositions. It can be combined with line-search and trust region techniques, and the representation has been developed for many quasi-Newton updates. For instance, the matrix vector product with the direct quasi-Newton Hessian and an arbitrary vector $g \in \mathbb{R}^n$ is:

$$\begin{align}
p^{(0)}_k &= J^T_k g \\
\text{solve} \quad N_k p^{(1)}_k &= p^{(0)}_k \quad \quad \text{(}N_k \text{ is small)} \\
p^{(2)}_k &= J_k p^{(1)}_k \\
p^{(3)}_k &= H_0 g \\
p^{\phantom{(4)}}_k       &= p^{(2)}_k + p^{(3)}_k
\end{align}$$

=== Background ===
In the context of the GMRES method, Walker showed that a product of Householder transformations (an identity plus rank-1) can be expressed as a compact matrix formula. This led to the derivation of an explicit matrix expression for the product of $k$ identity plus rank-1 matrices. Specifically, for
$$S_k = \begin{bmatrix} s_0 & s_1 & \ldots s_{k-1} \end{bmatrix},$$
$$~Y_k = \begin{bmatrix} y_0 & y_1 & \ldots y_{k-1} \end{bmatrix},$$
$~(R_k)_{ij} = s^T_{i-1} y_{j-1},$ $~\rho_{i-1} = 1/s^T_{i-1} y_{i-1}$ and $~V_i = I - \rho_{i-1} y_{i-1} s^T_{i-1}$ when $1 \le i \le j \le k$ the product of $k$ rank-1 updates to the identity is
$$\prod_{i=1}^k V_{i-1} =
\left( I - \rho_{0} y_{0} s^T_{0} \right) \cdots \left( I - \rho_{k-1} y_{k-1} s^T_{k-1} \right)
= I - Y_k R^{-1}_k S^T_k$$
The BFGS update can be expressed in terms of products of the $V_i$'s, which have a compact matrix formula. Therefore, the BFGS recursion can exploit these block matrix representations

| $$\begin{align} H_k &=  V_{k-1} H_{k-1} V^T_{k-1} + \rho_{k-1} s_{k-1} s^T_{k-1} \\ &=  \left( V_{k-1} \cdots V_1 V_0) H_0 (V^T_0 V^T_1 \cdots V^T_{k-1} \right) + \\ &\phantom{=}  \rho_0 \left( V_{k-1} \cdots V_1 \right)  s_0 s^T_0 \left( V^T_1 \cdots V^T_{k-1} \right) + \\ &\phantom{=}  \quad \vdots  \\ &\phantom{=} \rho_{k-2} V_{k-1} s_{k-2} s^T_{k-2} V^T_{k-1} + \\ &\phantom{=} \rho_{k-1} s_{k-1} s^T_{k-1} \end{align}$$ | 1 |

== Recursive quasi-Newton updates ==
A parametric family of quasi-Newton updates includes many of the most known formulas. For arbitrary vectors $v_{k}$ and $c_{k}$ such that $v^T_{k}y_{k}\ne 0$ and $c^T_{k}s_{k} \ne 0$ general recursive update formulas for the inverse and direct Hessian estimates are

| $$H_{k+1} = H_{k} + \frac{(s_{k} - H_{k}y_{k} )v^T_{k} + v_{k}(s_{k} - H_{k}y_{k})^T }{v^T_{k} y_{k}} - \frac{(s_{k}-H_{k}y_{k})^T y_{k}}{(v^T_{k} y_{k})^2} v_{k} v^T_{k}$$ | 2 |

| $$B_{k+1} = B_{k} + \frac{(y_{k} - B_{k}s_{k} )c^T_{k} + c_{k}(y_{k} - B_{k}s_{k})^T }{c^T_{k} s_{k}} - \frac{(y_{k}-B_{k}s_{k})^T s_{k}}{(c^T_{k} s_{k})^2} c_{k} c^T_{k}$$ | 3 |

By making specific choices for the parameter vectors $v_{k}$ and $c_{k}$ well known methods are recovered

Table 1: Quasi-Newton updates parametrized by vectors $v_{k}$ and $c_{k}$
| $v_{k}$ | $\text{method}$ | $c_{k}$ | $\text{method}$ |
|---|---|---|---|
| $s_{k}$ | BFGS | $s_{k}$ | PSB (Powell Symmetric Broyden) |
| $y_{k}$ | $\text{Greenstadt's}$ | $y_{k}$ | DFP |
| $s_{k}-H_{k}y_{k}$ | SR1 | $y_{k}-B_{k}s_{k}$ | SR1 |
| | | $P_k^{\text{S}} s_k$ | MSS (Multipoint-Symmetric-Secant) |

== Compact Representations ==
Collecting the updating vectors of the recursive formulas into matrices, define

$$S_k = \begin{bmatrix} s_0 & s_1 & \ldots & s_{k-1} \end{bmatrix},$$
$$Y_k = \begin{bmatrix} y_0 & y_1 & \ldots & y_{k-1} \end{bmatrix},$$
$$V_k = \begin{bmatrix} v_0 & v_1 & \ldots & v_{k-1} \end{bmatrix},$$
$$C_k = \begin{bmatrix} c_0 & c_1 & \ldots & c_{k-1} \end{bmatrix},$$

upper triangular

$$\big(R_k\big)_{ij} := \big(R^{\text{SY}}_k\big)_{ij} = s^T_{i-1}y_{j-1}, \quad  \big(R^{\text{VY}}_k\big)_{ij} = v^T_{i-1}y_{j-1}
, \quad  \big(R^{\text{CS}}_k\big)_{ij} = c^T_{i-1}s_{j-1}, \quad \quad \text{ for } 1 \le i \le j \le k$$

lower triangular

$$\big(L_k\big)_{ij} := \big(L^{\text{SY}}_k\big)_{ij} = s^T_{i-1}y_{j-1}, \quad  \big(L^{\text{VY}}_k\big)_{ij} = v^T_{i-1}y_{j-1}
, \quad  \big(L^{\text{CS}}_k\big)_{ij} = c^T_{i-1}s_{j-1}, \quad \quad \text{ for } 1 \le j < i \le k$$

and diagonal

$$(D_k)_{ij} := \big(D^{\text{SY}}_k\big)_{ij} = s^T_{i-1}y_{j-1}, \quad \quad \text{ for } 1 \le i = j \le k$$

With these definitions the compact representations of general rank-2 updates in (2) and (3) (including the well known quasi-Newton updates in Table 1) have been developed in Brust:

$$H_k = H_0 + U_k M^{-1}_k U^T_k,$$

4

$$U_k = \begin{bmatrix} V_k & S_k - H_0 Y_k \end{bmatrix}$$

$$M_k =
\begin{bmatrix} 0_{k \times k} & R^{\text{VY}}_k \\
\big( R^{\text{VY}}_k \big)^T & R_k+R^T_k-(D_k+Y^T_k H_0 Y_k)
\end{bmatrix}$$

and the formula for the direct Hessian is

$$B_k = B_0 + J_k N^{-1}_k J^T_k,$$

5

$$J_k = \begin{bmatrix} C_k & Y_k - B_0 S_k \end{bmatrix}$$

$$N_k =
\begin{bmatrix} 0_{k \times k} & R^{\text{CS}}_k \\
\big( R^{\text{CS}}_k \big)^T & R_k+R^T_k-(D_k+S^T_k B_0 S_k)
\end{bmatrix}$$

For instance, when $V_k = S_k$ the representation in (4) is the compact formula for the BFGS recursion in (1).

=== Specific Representations ===
Prior to the development of the compact representations of (2) and (3), equivalent representations have been discovered for most known updates (see Table 1).

==== BFGS ====
Along with the SR1 representation, the BFGS (Broyden-Fletcher-Goldfarb-Shanno) compact representation was the first compact formula known. In particular, the inverse representation is given by

$$H_k = H_0 + U_k M^{-1}_k U^T_k, \quad U_k = \begin{bmatrix} S_k & H_0 Y_k \end{bmatrix}, \quad  M^{-1}_k =
\left[\begin{smallmatrix} R^{-T}_k(D_k+Y^T_k H_0 Y_k) R^{-1}_k & -R^{-T}_k \\ -R^{-1}_k & 0 \end{smallmatrix} \right]$$
The direct Hessian approximation can be found by applying the Sherman-Morrison-Woodbury identity to the inverse Hessian:

$$B_k = B_0 + J_k N^{-1}_k J^T_k, \quad J_k = \begin{bmatrix} B_0 S_k & Y_k \end{bmatrix}, \quad  N_k =
\left[\begin{smallmatrix} S^T B_0 S_k & L_k \\ L^T_k & -D_k \end{smallmatrix} \right]$$

==== SR1 ====
The SR1 (Symmetric Rank-1) compact representation was first proposed in. Using the definitions of $D_k, L_k$ and $R_k$ from above, the inverse Hessian formula is given by

$H_k = H_0 + U_k M^{-1}_k U^T_k, \quad U_k = S_k-H_0 Y_k, \quad M_k = R_k+R^T_k-D_k-Y^T_k H_0 Y_k$

The direct Hessian is obtained by the Sherman-Morrison-Woodbury identity and has the form

$B_k = B_0 + J_k N^{-1}_k J^T_k, \quad J_k = Y_k-B_0 S_k, \quad N_k = D_k+L_k+L^T_k-S^T_k B_0 S_k$

==== MSS ====
The multipoint symmetric secant (MSS) method is a method that aims to satisfy multiple secant equations. The recursive update formula was originally developed by Burdakov. The compact representation for the direct Hessian was derived in

$$B_k = B_0 + J_k N^{-1}_k J^T_k, \quad J_k = \begin{bmatrix} S_k & Y_k - B_0 S_k \end{bmatrix}, \quad  N_k =
\left[\begin{smallmatrix} W_k(S^T_k B_0 S_k - (R_k - D_k +R^T_k))W_k & W_k \\ W_k & 0 \end{smallmatrix} \right]^{-1}, \quad W_k = (S^T_k S_k)^{-1}$$

Another equivalent compact representation for the MSS matrix is derived by rewriting $J_k$ in terms of
$$J_k = \begin{bmatrix} S_k & B_0 Y_k \end{bmatrix}$$
. The inverse representation can be obtained by application for the Sherman-Morrison-Woodbury identity.

==== DFP ====
Since the DFP (Davidon Fletcher Powell) update is the dual of the BFGS formula (i.e., swapping $H_k \leftrightarrow B_k$, $H_0 \leftrightarrow B_0$ and $y_k \leftrightarrow s_k$ in the BFGS update), the compact representation for DFP can be immediately obtained from the one for BFGS.

==== PSB ====
The PSB (Powell-Symmetric-Broyden) compact representation was developed for the direct Hessian approximation. It is equivalent to substituting $C_k = S_k$ in (5)

$$B_k = B_0 + J_k N^{-1}_k J^T_k, \quad J_k = \begin{bmatrix} S_k & Y_k-B_0 S_k \end{bmatrix}, \quad
N_k =
\left[\begin{smallmatrix} 0 & R^{\text{SS}}_k \\ (R^{\text{SS}}_k)^T & R_k+R^T_k-(D_k + S^T_k B_0 S_k) \end{smallmatrix} \right]$$

==== Structured BFGS ====
For structured optimization problems in which the objective function can be decomposed into two parts $f(x) = \widehat{k}(x) + \widehat{u}(x)$, where the gradients and Hessian of $\widehat{k}(x)$ are known but only the gradient of $\widehat{u}(x)$ is known, structured BFGS formulas exist. The compact representation of these methods has the general form of (5), with specific $J_k$ and $N_k$.

==== Reduced BFGS ====
The reduced compact representation (RCR) of BFGS is for linear equality constrained optimization $\text{ minimize } f(x) \text{ subject to: } Ax = b$, where $A$ is underdetermined. In addition to the matrices $S_k, Y_k$ the RCR also stores the projections of the $y_i$'s onto the nullspace of $A$

$$Z_k = \begin{bmatrix} z_0 & z_1 & \cdots z_{k-1} \end{bmatrix}, \quad z_i = P y_i,
\quad P = I - A (A^TA)^{-1} A^T, \quad 0 \le i \le k-1$$

For $B_k$ the compact representation of the BFGS matrix (with a multiple of the identity $B_0$) the (1,1) block of the inverse KKT matrix has the compact representation

$$K_k =
\begin{bmatrix}
B_k & A^T \\
A & 0
\end{bmatrix},
\quad B_0 =  \frac{1}{\gamma_k}I, \quad H_0 =  \gamma_k I, \quad \gamma_k > 0$$

$$\big(K^{-1}_k \big)_{11} = H_0 + U_k M^{-1}_k U^T_k, \quad U_k = \begin{bmatrix} A^T & S_k & Z_k \end{bmatrix}, \quad  M_k =
\left[\begin{smallmatrix} - AA^T / \gamma_k &  \\  & G_k \end{smallmatrix} \right], \quad
G_k =  \left[\begin{smallmatrix} R^{-T}_k(D_k+Y^T_k H_0 Y_k) R^{-1}_k & -H_0 R^{-T}_k \\ -H_0R^{-1}_k & 0 \end{smallmatrix} \right]^{-1}$$

== Limited Memory ==
Pattern in a limited-memory updating strategy. With a memory parameter of $m=7$, the first $k \le m$ iterations fill the matrix (e.g., an upper triangular for the compact representation, $R_k = \text{triu}(S^T_kY_k)$). For $k > m$ the limited-memory techniques discards the oldest information and add a new column to the end.

The most common use of the compact representations is for the limited-memory setting where $m \ll n$ denotes the memory parameter, with typical values around $m \in [5,12]$ (see e.g.,). Then, instead of storing the history of all vectors one limits this to the $m$ most recent vectors $\{ (s_i, y_i \}_{i=k-m}^{k-1}$ and possibly $\{ v_i \}_{i=k-m}^{k-1}$ or $\{ c_i \}_{i=k-m}^{k-1}$. Further, typically the initialization is chosen as an adaptive multiple of the identity $H^{(0)}_k = \gamma_k I$, with $\gamma_k = y^T_{k-1} s_{k-1} / y^T_{k-1} y_{k-1}$ and $B^{(0)}_k = \frac{1}{\gamma_k} I$. Limited-memory methods are frequently used for large-scale problems with many variables (i.e., $n$ can be large), in which the limited-memory matrices $S_k \in \mathbb{R}^{n \times m}$ and $Y_k \in \mathbb{R}^{n \times m}$ (and possibly $V_k, C_k$) are tall and very skinny:
$$S_k = \begin{bmatrix} s_{k-l-1} & \ldots & s_{k-1} \end{bmatrix}$$
and
$$Y_k = \begin{bmatrix} y_{k-l-1} & \ldots & y_{k-1} \end{bmatrix}$$.

== Implementations ==
Open source implementations include:

- ACM TOMS algorithm 1030 implements a L-SR1 solver
- R's optim general-purpose optimizer routine uses the L-BFGS-B method.
- SciPy's optimization module's minimize method also includes an option to use L-BFGS-B.
- IPOPT with first order information

Non open source implementations include:

- Artelys Knitro nonlinear programming (NLP) solvers use compact quasi-Newton matrices
- L-BFGS-B (ACM TOMS algorithm 778)
