= Jacques Mairesse =

Jacques Mairesse may refer to:

- Jacques Mairesse (footballer) (1905–1940), French footballer who played in the 1934 FIFA World Cup
- Jacques Mairesse (economist) (born 1940), French economist and the posthumous son of the above
