= Emilio Spedicato =

Italian mathematician (born 1945)

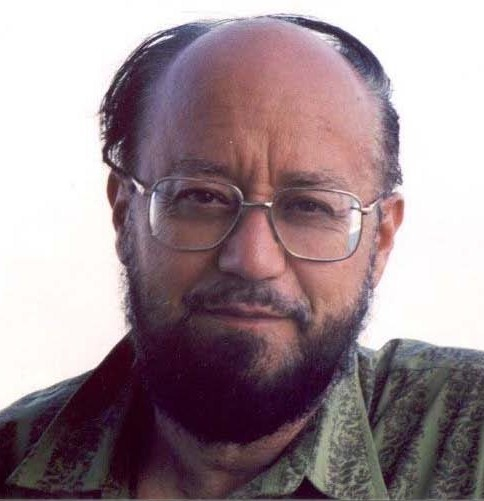
- Born: April 15, 1945 (age 81); Milan
- Scientific career
- Fields: Mathematics

Emilio Spedicato (born 1945) is full professor of operations research at the University of Bergamo in Italy. He attended the Liceo Classico Manzoni, obtaining (with Enrico Camporesi, now medical professor in Florida) the highest score in northern Italy at the final exams. He graduated in physics at Milan University and was the first non-Chinese to receive a PhD in a mathematical discipline in China, at Dalian University of Technology. Starting in 1969, he worked for seven years at CISE, a nuclear research center near Milano. He also spent two years in the United Kingdom, University of Essex, and the United States, at Stanford University. He then moved to the University of Bergamo as a professor in operations research and was for many years director of its mathematics department.

== Disciplines ==
He has been active in different disciplines, as shown by his list of about 500 papers, of which some 300 in mathematics.

=== Quasi-Newton methods ===
In mathematics he worked ten years in the field of Quasi-Newton methods, obtaining the first results on optimal conditioning and invariance to nonlinear scaling.

=== ABS methods ===
Then, motivated by a seminar of József Abaffy, he developed within an international collaboration the new field of ABS (Abaffy-Broyden-Spedicato) methods. These are based on the little-known rank-one reducing matrix iteration due to Jenő Egerváry, a great Hungarian mathematician who committed suicide after hostility from communist bureaucrats. The work on ABS methods started in 1981 and is still continued. It has involved mainly Hungarians (Abaffy, Galántai, Jeney,…), Chinese (Deng, Zhu, Xia, Zhang, Huang, Li…) and Iranians (Mahdavi-Amiri, Esmaeili, Mirnia….). It has produced over 400 papers, three international conferences in China and two monographs: one in 1989 by Abaffy and Spedicato, based upon some 60 papers, and another in 1998 by Xia and Zhang, based upon some 250 papers. A third monograph is envisaged.

The main results by ABS methods include:

- unification of algorithms for linear systems and linearly constrained optimization
- improvement of the classic method of Gauss for linear system, by reducing memory and eliminating pivoting; the obtained method has also a natural application to the simplex algorithm for linear programming, where it can be up one order faster than the best of other methods
- derivation of algorithms for nonlinear equations that are more efficient than Newton's method in memory, stepwise convergence, without requiring nonsingularity of Jacobian at solution
- derivation of a general algorithm for linear Diophantine equations, i.e. for the linear solvable Hilbert's tenth problems, with extension to Diophantine inequalities and linear programming. Here the classic Euler condition for the existence of integer solutions is generalized for the first time from a single equation to a system, and similarly is generalized the method of Rosser.

=== Applied optimization ===
Other mathematical work of Spedicato has dealt with applications of optimization to industrial problems, especially to the reduction of fuel consumption and noxious emissions by cars, on data from Alfa Romeo and Fiat.

=== Mechanics and astronomy ===
He also has worked in celestial mechanics, in particular analyzing the effects of an inversion of the rotation axis of Earth (the results confirm statements in Herodotus and Pomponius Mela). Work in progress regards a new theory for the origin of the Moon (by capture from a passing by planet) and the study of a super Tunguska explosion over northern Germany, which may explain such things as the events of Exodus and the Deucalian flood.

== Other interests ==
Spedicato's interests also concern ancient history, especially with respect to catastrophic events of extraterrestrial nature, where he has published papers related to Atlantis, Exodus and the Tunguska-type impacts of 1178 AD over the Pacific. He has also studied problems in biblical and other ancient texts, dealing e.g. with the geography of Eden and Gilgamesh's travels, the empire of Solomon, the origin of the Etruscans within the theory of Alinei who has shown their language to be ancient Hungarian.

Finally he has interests in the musical field, started by a contact with prof Taboga, who found a convincing explanation for Mozart's death and showed that Andrea Luchesi, the teacher of Beethoven, played an essential role in the origin of the Wiener Klassik. These interests have been devoted recently to operatic music, after his discovery that Gigli and Pertile were family friends. He has met such stars of lyric as Valdengo, Taddei, Panerai, Di Stefano, Bergonzi, Prandelli, Olivero, Stella, Cerquetti and Maliponte, and is presently working on a book devoted to Puccini.
