= Tolmin (disambiguation) =

Tolmin may refer to:

- TOLMIN, an optimization software that minimizes a general differentiable nonlinear function subject to linear constraints, written by Michael J. D. Powell.
- Tolmin, a town in northwestern Slovenia.
- The Municipality of Tolmin in northwestern Slovenia.
