= Michael J. D. Powell =

Applied mathematician (1936–2015)

Michael Powell FRS FAA
- Born: Michael James David Powell; 29 July 1936; London
- Died: 19 April 2015 (aged 78)
- Education: Frensham Heights School; Eastbourne College
- Alma mater: University of Cambridge (BA, ScD)
- Known for: Powell's method Davidon–Fletcher–Powell formula
- Awards: Naylor Prize and Lectureship
- Scientific career
- Fields: Numerical analysis Optimization; Approximation
- Workplaces: University of Cambridge
- Website: michaeljdpowell.blogspot.co.uk

Michael James David Powell FRS FAA (29 July 1936 – 19 April 2015) was a British mathematician, who worked in the Department of Applied Mathematics and Theoretical Physics (DAMTP) at the University of Cambridge.

== Education and early life ==
Born in London, Powell was educated at Frensham Heights School and Eastbourne College. He earned his Bachelor of Arts degree followed by a Doctor of Science (DSc) degree in 1979 at the University of Cambridge.

== Career and research ==
Powell was known for his extensive work in numerical analysis, especially nonlinear optimisation and approximation. He was a founding member of the Institute of Mathematics and its Applications and a founding editor-in-chief of IMA Journal of Numerical Analysis. His mathematical contributions include quasi-Newton methods, particularly the Davidon–Fletcher–Powell formula and the Powell's Symmetric Broyden formula, augmented Lagrangian function (also called Powell–Rockafellar penalty function), sequential quadratic programming method (also called as Wilson–Han–Powell method), trust region algorithms (Powell's dog leg method), conjugate direction method (also called Powell's method), and radial basis function. He had been working on derivative-free optimization algorithms in recent years, the resultant algorithms including COBYLA, UOBYQA, NEWUOA, BOBYQA, and LINCOA. He was the author of numerous scientific papers and of several books, most notably Approximation Theory and Methods.

=== Awards and honours ===
Powell won several awards, including the George B. Dantzig Prize from the Mathematical Programming Society/Society for Industrial and Applied Mathematics (SIAM) and the Naylor Prize from the London Mathematical Society. Powell was elected a Foreign Associate of the National Academy of Sciences of the United States in 2001 and as a corresponding fellow to the Australian Academy of Science in 2007.
