= Bunch–Nielsen–Sorensen formula =

In mathematics, in particular linear algebra, the Bunch–Nielsen–Sorensen formula, named after James R. Bunch, Christopher P. Nielsen and Danny C. Sorensen, expresses the eigenvectors of the sum of a symmetric matrix $A$ and the outer product, $v v^T$, of vector $v$ with itself.

== Statement ==
Let $\lambda_i$ denote the eigenvalues of $A$ and $\tilde\lambda_i$ denote the eigenvalues of the updated matrix $\tilde A = A + v v^T$. In the special case when $A$ is diagonal, the eigenvectors $\tilde q_i$ of $\tilde A$ can be written

$$(\tilde q_i)_k = \frac{N_i v_k}{\lambda_k - \tilde \lambda_i}$$

where $N_i$ is a number that makes the vector $\tilde q_i$ normalized.

== Derivation ==
This formula can be derived from the Sherman–Morrison formula by examining the poles of $(A-\tilde\lambda I+vv^T)^{-1}$.

== Remarks ==
The eigenvalues of $\tilde A$ were studied by Golub.

Numerical stability of the computation is studied by Gu and Eisenstat.

== See also ==
- Sherman–Morrison formula
