= Berndt–Hall–Hall–Hausman algorithm =

Numerical optimization algorithm

The Berndt–Hall–Hall–Hausman (BHHH) algorithm is a numerical optimization algorithm similar to the Newton–Raphson algorithm, but it replaces the observed negative Hessian matrix with the outer product of the gradient. This approximation is based on the information matrix equality and therefore only valid while maximizing a likelihood function. The BHHH algorithm is named after the four originators: Ernst R. Berndt, Bronwyn Hall, Robert Hall, and Jerry Hausman.

== Usage ==
If a nonlinear model is fitted to the data one often needs to estimate coefficients through optimization. A number of optimization algorithms have the following general structure. Suppose that the function to be optimized is Q(β). Then the algorithms are iterative, defining a sequence of approximations, β_{k} given by

$$\beta_{k+1}=\beta_{k}-\lambda_{k}A_{k}\frac{\partial Q}{\partial \beta}(\beta_{k}),$$,

where $\beta_{k}$ is the parameter estimate at step k, and $\lambda_{k}$ is a parameter (called step size) which partly determines the particular algorithm. For the BHHH algorithm λ_{k} is determined by calculations within a given iterative step, involving a line-search until a point β_{k+1} is found satisfying certain criteria. In addition, for the BHHH algorithm, Q has the form

$$Q = \sum_{i=1}^{N} Q_i$$

and A is calculated using

$$A_{k}=\left[\sum_{i=1}^{N}\frac{\partial \ln Q_i}{\partial \beta}(\beta_{k})\frac{\partial \ln Q_i}{\partial \beta}(\beta_{k})'\right]^{-1} .$$

In other cases, e.g. Newton–Raphson, $A_{k}$ can have other forms. The BHHH algorithm has the advantage that, if certain conditions apply, convergence of the iterative procedure is guaranteed.

== See also ==
- Davidon–Fletcher–Powell (DFP) algorithm
- Broyden–Fletcher–Goldfarb–Shanno (BFGS) algorithm
