= David Shanno =

American mathematician (1938–2019)

David F. Shanno (born April 19, 1938 – 2019) was an American mathematician, who specialized in mathematical optimization and operations research. He was professor emeritus at Rutgers University (Rutgers Center for Operations Research, Rutcor).

Shanno obtained his B.Sc. in mathematics from Yale University in 1959, his M.Sc. in mathematics from Carnegie-Mellon University 1962, and his Ph.D. in 1967. He held positions at the University of Chicago, the University of Toronto, the University of Arizona and the University of California, Davis before becoming professor at Rutgers University.

In 1970 he was one of the developers of the BFGS algorithm, a Quasi-Newton method.

In 2005 he became a fellow at INFORMS. He received the E.M.L. Beale – W.B. Orchard-Hayes Prize for Excellence in Computational Mathematical Programming of the Mathematical Programming Society in 1991 together with I. J. Lustig and R. E. Marsten. Shanno was associate editor of the journal Mathematical Programming from 1980 to 1989 and of the Journal of Optimization Theory and Applications from 1982 to 1990.
