= Javier Andreu-Perez =

British researcher

Javier Andreu-Perez is a British computer scientist and a Senior Lecturer and Chair in Smart Health Technologies at the University of Essex. He is also associate editor-in-chief of Neurocomputing for the area of Deep Learning and Machine Learning. Andreu-Perez research is mainly focused on Human-Centered Artificial Intelligence (HCAI). He also chairs a interdisciplinary lab in this area, HCAI-Essex.

== Early life and education ==
Andreu-Perez was born in Málaga, Spain. During his childhood he spent time living in Essex (United Kingdom), where he later in life joined as an academic, at University of Essex. He received his PhD in Intelligent Systems from Lancaster University (United Kingdom) in 2012. He is also alumni of the Hamlyn Centre at Imperial College London, which is one of the centers that form part of the Institute of Global Health Innovation. The centre focuses on the development of technological innovations for global health challenges.

== Research and career ==
Andreu-Perez started his career investigating novel ways for generic human activity recognition from wearables by means of evolving intelligent systems techniques. His PhD focused on the development of evolving intelligent systems for problems arising from ubiquitous computing technologies, like the stochasticity and uncertainty of data modelling tasks such the recognition of human activity recognition by means of pervasive computing sensors. His research envisaged the utility of smart implants to replace wearables in achieving personalized healthcare in order to reshape the management of acute and chronic diseases. He has also collaborated with the British multinational pharmaceutic company GlaxoSmithKline for research on use of body sensors for the understanding of chronic conditions such as Rheumatoid Arthritis. Andreu-Perez was an invited faculty at the foundational (1st edition) Digital Rheumatology Day and annual international event organised by the swisse Foundation for Research into Musculoskeletal and Rheumatic Diseases (RMR).

Andreu-Perez later investigations were part of the EPSRC-NIHR Healthcare Technology Cooperatives Partnership: Technology Network-Plus on Devices for Surgery and Rehabilitation. In this project he explored the development of adaptive brain computer interface systems that uses fuzzy sets and systems to model neural uncertainty. His more recent scientific contributions have involved the combination of fuzzy logic and convolutional neural networks for this endeavour in smart environments. Making his first contribution in 2016, he also works in the development of techniques that combines brain connectivity estimators with machine learning and fuzzy logic for recognizing cognitive profiles. Among his most recent research he has been involved in the development of explainable artificial intelligence methods in developmental cognitive neuroscience. The official magazine of the IEEE Computational Intelligence Society featured an article from Andreu-Perez's group discussing his perspective in this research question.

His research in health has been featured in the international news media.

== Academic esteem ==
Andreu-Perez was in 2020 one of the 12 awardees of the Talentia Senior Fellowship program. An international scheme that offered three-years funding support for researchers with an excellent scientific and leadership curriculum to perform research with public research institutions in Andalusia, Spain. In 2017 he was also first prize winner at the Research Associate Symposium of the Department of Computing, Imperial College London.
