= Tulsa Community Foundation =

Community foundation in Oklahoma, US

- Formation: 1998
- Type: Non-profit Community Foundation
- Location: Tulsa, Oklahoma
- Region served: Oklahoma
- Method: Grant-making
- Key people: Phil Lakin; CEO
- Endowment: US$ $4,991,900,000 (2021)
- Website: www.tulsacf.org

The Tulsa Community Foundation (TCF) is one of the largest community foundations in the United States. Headquartered in Tulsa, Oklahoma, as of January 2011 it was reported to have approximately four billion dollars in assets, and to have donated more than $580 million to local charities and government projects.

Tulsa Community Foundation is a tax-exempt, public charity organized in 1998. It was founded by Tulsa oilman, banker, and philanthropist George Kaiser, who felt that Tulsa's historical dependence on unorganized private giving from its wealthy families was no longer effective. Beginning with gifts from seventeen local philanthropists, by 2006 Tulsa Community Foundation had grown to become the largest community foundation in the country, surpassing The New York Community Trust, and it remained the largest until 2013, when a $1 billion contribution lifted the Silicon Valley Community Foundation into first place. Kaiser's family foundation remains the largest contributor to the community foundation, which also manages about 600 donor advised funds.

In 2005, members of the United States Senate Committee on Finance, and others, criticized the foundation structure of TCF, and other charities, for arguably permitting givers to take tax deductions out of proportion to the actual amounts given for public charity, and for potentially allowing the donors to have effective control of the community foundation. Because the Tulsa Community Foundation (unlike some private foundations) is not restricted from making gifts to government agencies, it has also drawn occasional comment and criticism for its potential influence on local government.

== See also ==
- Emergency Infant Services
