= Bronwyn Hall =

American economist

Bronwyn Hughes Hall

Academic background
- Education: Wellesley College (BSc.); Stanford University (Ph.D.)

Academic work
- Discipline: Innovation economics
- Institutions: University of California, Berkeley
- Notable ideas: BHHH algorithm

Bronwyn Hughes Hall is the Emerita Professor of Economics at the University of California at Berkeley.

== Education ==
Hall received a B.A. in Physics from Wellesley College in 1966 and a Ph.D. in economics from Stanford University in 1988.

== Career ==
She was professor of economics of technology and innovation at Maastricht University between 2005 and 2015. Hall founded TSP International, an econometric software firm, from which she has severed ties.

Hall is a research associate of the National Bureau of Economic Research and the Institute for Fiscal Studies. She is also a visiting fellow at the National Institute of Economic and Social Research.

In 2024, Hall was named American Economic Association Distinguished Fellow.

== Bibliography ==
- Bronwyn H. Hall; Nathan Rosenberg (2010). Handbook of the Economics of Innovation. Vol. One. Elsevier. ISBN 978-0-08-093111-1. OCLC 460059014.
- Bronwyn H. Hall; Nathan Rosenberg (2010). Handbook of the Economics of Innovation. Vol. Two. North Holland. ISBN 978-0-444-53611-2.
- Bronwyn H. Hall; Francesca Lotti; Jacques Mairesse (2007). Employment, Innovation, and Productivity: Evidence from Italian Microdata. National Bureau of Economic Research. OCLC 166353672.
