= ABS methods =

Methods for generating algorithms

ABS methods, where the acronym contains the initials of Jozsef Abaffy, Charles G. Broyden and Emilio Spedicato, have been developed since 1981 to generate a large class of algorithms for the following applications:

- solution of general linear algebraic systems, determined or underdetermined,
- full or deficient rank;
- solution of linear Diophantine systems, i.e. equation systems where the coefficient matrix and the right hand side are integer valued and an integer solution is sought; this is a special but important case of Hilbert's tenth problem, the only one in practice soluble;
- solution of nonlinear algebraic equations;
- solution of continuous unconstrained or constrained optimization.

At the beginning of 2007 ABS literature consisted of over 400 papers and reports and two monographs, one due to Abaffy and Spedicato and published in 1989, one due to Xia and Zhang and published, in Chinese, in 1998. Moreover, three conferences had been organized in China.

Research on ABS methods has been the outcome of an international collaboration coordinated by Spedicato of university of Bergamo, Italy. It has involved over forty mathematicians from Hungary, UK, China, Iran and other countries.

The central element in such methods is the use of a special matrix transformation due essentially to the Hungarian mathematician Jenő Egerváry, who investigated its main properties in some papers that went unnoticed. For the basic problem of solving a linear system of m equations in n variables, where $\scriptstyle m \,\leq\, n$, ABS methods use the following simple geometric idea:

1. Given an arbitrary initial estimate of the solution, find one of the infinite solutions, defining a linear variety of dimension n − 1, of the first equation.
2. Find a solution of the second equation that is also a solution of the first, i.e. find a solution lying in the intersection of the linear varieties of the solutions of the first two equations considered separately.
3. By iteration of the above approach after m' steps one gets a solution of the last equation that is also a solution of the previous equations, hence of the full system. Moreover, it is possible to detect equations that are either redundant or incompatible.

Among the main results obtained so far:

- unification of algorithms for linear, nonlinear algebraic equations and for linearly constrained nonlinear optimization, including the LP problem as a special case;
- the method of Gauss has been improved by reducing the required memory and eliminating the need for pivoting;
- new methods for nonlinear systems with convergence properties better than for Newton method;
- derivation of a general algorithm for Hilbert tenth problem, linear case, with the extension of a classic Euler theorem from one equation to a system;
- solvers have been obtained that are more stable than classical ones, especially for the problem arising in primal-dual interior point method;
- ABS methods are usually faster on vector or parallel machines;
- ABS methods provide a simpler approach for teaching for a variety of classes of problems, since particular methods are obtained just by specific parameter choices.

Knowledge of ABS methods is still quite limited among mathematicians, but they have great potential for improving the methods currently in use.

== Bibliography ==
- Jozsef Abaffy, Emilio Spedicato (1989): ABS Projection Algorithms: Mathematical Techniques for Linear and Nonlinear Algebraic Equations, Ellis Horwood, Chichester. The first monograph on the subject
- Jozsef Abaffy, Charles G. Broyden, Emilio Spedicato (1984): A class of direct methods for linear equations, Numerische Mathematik 45, 361–376. Paper introducing ABS methods for continuous linear systems.
- H. Esmaeili, N. Mahdavi-Amiri, Emilio Spedicato: A class of ABS algorithms for Diophantine linear systems, Numerische Mathematik 90, 101–115. Paper introducing ABS methods for integer linear systems.
