= Charles George Broyden =

British mathematician

Charles George Broyden (3 February 1933 – 20 May 2011) was a mathematician who specialized in optimization problems and numerical linear algebra. While a physicist working at English Electric Company from 1961 to 1965, he adapted the Davidon–Fletcher–Powell formula to solving some nonlinear systems of equations that he was working with, leading to his widely cited 1965 paper, "A class of methods for solving nonlinear simultaneous equations". He was a lecturer at UCW Aberystwyth from 1965 to 1967. He later became a senior lecturer at University of Essex from 1967 to 1970, where he independently discovered the Broyden–Fletcher–Goldfarb–Shanno (BFGS) method. The BFGS method has then become a key technique in solving nonlinear optimization problems. Moreover, he was among those who derived the symmetric rank-one updating formula, and his name was also attributed to Broyden's methods and Broyden family of quasi-Newton methods. After leaving the University of Essex, he continued his research career in the Netherlands and Italy, being awarded the chair at University of Bologna. In later years, he began focusing on numerical linear algebra, in particular conjugate gradient methods and their taxonomy.

Broyden died from complications of a severe stroke at the age of 78. He was survived by his wife, Joan, and their three children Chris, Jane and Nick.

A Charles Broyden Prize was established in 2009 to "honor this remarkable researcher" by Optimization Methods and Software in the international optimization community.

== See also ==
- Broyden's method
- BFGS method
- ABS methods
