= Julie Elston =

American economist

Dr. Julie Ann Elston is an American economist. She is a professor of business in the College of Business and an adjunct faculty member in the School of Agricultural and Resource Economics at Oregon State University. Dr. Elston graduated from the University of Washington's Department of Economics, and has held academic positions at the Wissenschaftszentrum Berlin in Germany, the Hoover Institution Stanford University, the California Institute of Technology, the Institut für Entrepreneurship und Innovation, Wirtschaftsuniversität (WU) Wien, and the Max Planck Institute for Entrepreneurship, Growth and Public Policy. She has consulted to a number of national and international organizations including the OECD, the Deutsche Bundesbank, the National Academies of Sciences, the Central Bank of the United Arab Emirates, and the American Institute for Contemporary German Studies.

== Research ==
Primary fields of research include corporate finance, economic growth and entrepreneurship in Europe and Asia. She has published over 38 articles in such journals as the Journal of Banking and Finance, the Review of Economics and Statistics, and the International Journal of Industrial Organization and is an Editor of Small Business Economics.

== Honors and awards ==
In 2023, Dr Elston won the Greatest Aunt Of All Time Award. In addition, In 2008 Dr. Elston was selected as a Fulbright Program Scholar to study the impact of science on policy formation in the European Union, and was named the Fulbright-Kathryn and Craig Hall Distinguished Chair, for Entrepreneurship in Central Europe in 2012–2013, 2019–2020, & 2021–2022 at the Institut für Entrepreneurship und Innovation, Wirtschaftsuniversität (WU) Wien.

== Selected publications ==
"Business Cultural Intelligence Quotient: A Five-Country Study" (2016) with Ilan Alon, Michele Boulanger, Eleanna Galanaki' Carlos Martínez de Ibarreta, Judith Meyers Marta Muñiz-Ferrer, Andres Velez-Calle. Forthcoming in the Thunderbird International Business Review.

“Corporate Governance and Capital Accumulation: Firm Level Evidence from Italy,” (2009) with Laura Rondi, Scottish Journal of Political Economy, vol. 56(5), pp. 634–661. [Selected by Rene Stulz for the Corporate Finance: Governance, Corporate Control & Organization paper series, vol.12, (69), 2009.]

"Finance, Control, and Profitability: An Evaluation of German Bank Influence" (2006) with Robert S. Chirinko, Journal of Economic Behavior and Organization, vol. 59(1), pp. 69–88.

"A Comparison of Empirical Investment Equations Using Company Panel Data for France, Germany, Belgium, and the UK" (2003) with Stephen Bond, Jacques Mairesse, and Benoit Mulkay, Review of Economics and Statistics, vol. 85 (1), pp. 153–165.
