= Electrolyte–insulator–semiconductor sensor =

Type of electronic converter

Principle of EIS sensor

Within electronics, an Electrolyte–insulator–semiconductor (EIS) sensor is a sensor that is made of these three components:

- an electrolyte with the chemical that should be measured
- an insulator that allows field-effect interaction, without leak currents between the two other components
- a semiconductor to register the chemical changes

The EIS sensor can be used in combination with other structures, for example to construct a light-addressable potentiometric sensor (LAPS).
