= Donald Goldfarb =

American mathematician (born 1941)

- Born: November 14, 1941 (age 84); New York City
- Known for: BFGS algorithm
- Awards: John von Neumann Theory Prize

Academic background
- Education: Cornell University (BChE,1963); Princeton University (MA,1965); Columbia University (PhD,1966)
- Thesis: A Conjugate Gradient Method for Nonlinear Programming (1966)
- Doctoral advisor: Leon Lapidus

Academic work
- Discipline: mathematics
- Sub-discipline: optimization

Donald Goldfarb (born August 14, 1941 in New York City) is an American mathematician, best known for his works in mathematical optimization and numerical analysis. He is one of the developers of the BFGS algorithm. He is a recipient of the Von Neumann Theory Prize and Khachiyan Prize.

== Biography ==
Goldfarb studied Chemical Engineering at Cornell University, earning a BSChE in 1963. He obtained an M.S. from Princeton University in 1965, and a doctorate in 1966.

After getting his Ph.D., Goldfarb spent two years as a post-doc at the Courant Institute in New York City.

In 1968, he co-founded the CS Department at the City College of New York, serving 14 years on its faculty. During the 1979-80 academic year, he was a visiting professor in the CS and ORIE Departments at Cornell University. In 1982, Goldfarb joined the IEOR Department at Columbia, serving as Chair from 1984-2002. He also served as Interim Dean of Columbia's School of Engineering and Applied Science during the 1994-95 and 2012-13 academic years and its Executive Vice Dean during the Spring 2012 semester. He retired from his faculty position at Columbia in 2024.

Goldfarb is one of the developers of the Broyden–Fletcher–Goldfarb–Shanno algorithm (BFGS). In 1992, he and J. J. Forrest developed the steepest edge simplex method.

== Awards ==
Goldfarb is National Academy of Engineering (NAE) member and SIAM Fellow. He was awarded the INFORMS John Von Neumann Theory Prize in 2017, the Khachiyan Prize in 2013, the INFORMS Prize for Research Excellence in the Interface between OR and CS in 1995, and was listed in The Worlds Most Influential Scientific Minds, 2014, as being among the 99 most cited mathematicians between 2002 and 2012. Goldfarb has served as an editor-in-chief of Mathematical Programming, an editor of the SIAM Journal on Numerical Analysis and the SIAM Journal on Optimization, and as an associate editor of Mathematics of Computation, Operations Research and Mathematical Programming Computation.
