= Emergency Infant Services =

- Founded: January 1, 1977
- Founder: Linda Watts
- Type: Non-governmental organization
- Purpose: Humanitarian
- Location: Tulsa, Oklahoma
- Region served: Regional
- Method: Aid
- Revenue: US$ $1,634,437 (2011)
- Endowment: US$ $271,663.62 from the Tulsa Community Foundation
- Employees: 11
- Volunteers: 900

Emergency Infant Services (EIS) is a nonprofit organization based in Tulsa, Oklahoma, focused on meeting the basic human needs of infants and children under five years old.

== History ==
Emergency Infant Services was founded on January 1, 1977, by Linda Watts in the balcony of the Second Presbyterian Church in Tulsa, Oklahoma. Noticing how unexpected circumstances made it temporarily impossible for families to make ends meet, she decided it was time to lend a helping hand. The goal from the beginning has always been to help prevent families from falling further into a poverty cycle by helping with their immediate needs such as formula, diapers, food, wipes, clothing, and car seats. Currently, over half of the EIS' clients use the services provided only once a year, showing the agency is indeed helping them in a time of extenuating difficult circumstances. It was not until 2012 that EIS recognized it was time to expand its services to a second location and opened a new location on the East Side of Tulsa. By 2017, it was serving 30% of the total number of children being served each year. With that success, it was decided to open a satellite location with diapers and formula at the South Tulsa Community Center and a second one at the Dream Center. Combined, those two locations serve nearly 400 children each year. EIS has made it a mission to find partners in the Tulsa community to help support some of the long-term services clients need in addition to the short-term. The Blue Cross Blue Shield of Oklahoma provides free immunizations and other health services to families. Along with the Blue Cross Blue Shield, the Oklahoma Health Department and the Parent Child Center have also partnered with EIS to provide additional services to the community at large.

== Activities ==
EIS is a Tulsa charity that provides emergency support for families with children aged less than six years of age and are in crises or emergency situations, including unemployment or under-employment, illness or injury, spousal and/or child abandonment, and home losses due to natural disasters such as tornadoes, floods, or fires.

Eighty-five percent of those who use EIS’ services are the working poor: people struggling to make ends meet and occasionally needing "a hand up".

To provide immediate access for needy parents, EIS does not require appointments, income qualification, or complex paperwork to be filled out.

Immediate and free services are provided for diapers & pull-ups, infant formula, children's & maternity clothing, medications, hygiene items, linens, cribs, and child safety seats. EIS also functions as a Tulsa food pantry for baby foods and toddler foods.

EIS assisted with the creation of infant crisis services in Oklahoma City, Oklahoma, Ft. Worth, Texas, and Houston, Texas. The Tulsa location assists over 1000 infants and toddlers each month.

Over 900 volunteers in Tulsa support EIS. In 2011, EIS provided food, clothing, medical assistance, furniture, car seats, and social services to over 8,235 families with 13,723 infant children.

Fundraising consists of an endowment from the Tulsa Community Foundation, and fundraisers including "$35,000 in 35 days".

In 2016–2017, EIS served 10,075 families consisting of 18,805 children providing 690,545 diapers as well as 305,160 bottles of formula.

== Awards ==
=== Oklahoma non-profit Excellence Awards ===
Emergency Infant Services was a 2012 finalist for the Oklahoma non-profit Excellence Awards, sponsored by the Oklahoma Center for Non-Profits, a nonprofit organization equipping and strengthening the Oklahoma nonprofit sector through training, consulting, advocacy, membership, networking, and awards.

=== Champion of children's health ===
Emergency Infant Services was a 2011 finalist for Champion of Children's Health, sponsored by the Champions of Health organization, a program that "celebrates people and organizations that are making a positive impact on the health of Oklahoma citizens through innovative programs."

In 2012, Emergency Infant Services won the Champion of Children's Health award.
