= Jacques Mairesse (economist) =

French economist

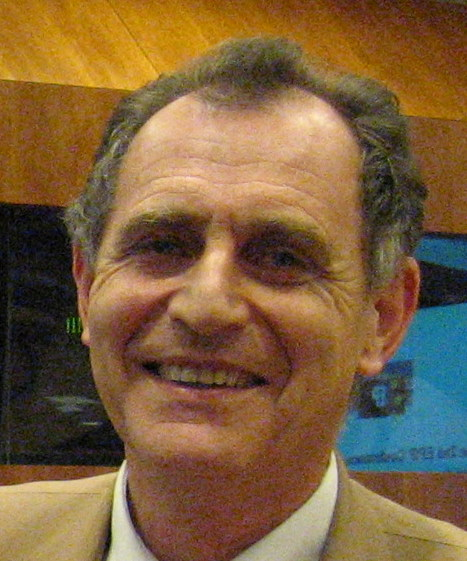
- Born: August 16, 1940 (age 86); Paris, France

Academic background
- Education: University of Paris 1 Pantheon-Sorbonne (D.E.S. Sciences Economiques, 1970); ENSAE (1963–1965) ) Ecole Polytechnique (1960–1962)

Academic work
- Discipline: Production economics Panel data econometrics
- Institutions: CREST-ENSAE, UNU-MERIT, EHESS
- Website: Information at IDEAS / RePEc

Jacques Mairesse (born August 16, 1940) is a French economist. He is the posthumous son of Jacques Mairesse (1905–1940), an international French association footballer.

== Biography ==
Mairesse was director of studies of EHESS (École des hautes études en sciences sociales) from 1978 onwards. He was director of ENSAE (École nationale de la statistique et de l'administration économique) from 1980 to 1990. He was general inspector of INSEE (Institut National de la Statistique et des Etudes Economiques) from 1988 to 2005. He is a founding member of the Center for Research in Economics and Statistics (CREST), the research centre of INSEE, that was created in 1990. He is a senior researcher of the microeconometric laboratory at CREST and at GRECSTA (Groupe de Recherche en Economie et Statistique). He is a research associate of the NBER (National Bureau of Economic Research) since 1980. He is professor of applied econometrics of research, innovation and productivity at Maastricht University and professorial fellow of UNU-MERIT since 2005. He is a fellow of the European Economic Association.

== Research ==
Influenced by the pioneering work of Zvi Griliches – with whom he coauthored several papers – on the economics of technological change, economic data issues, errors in variables and panel data, his research has been mainly in the field of production economics and panel data econometrics, focusing on measurement of capital, productivity and technical change issues. Throughout his life, he has been engaged in various comparative studies, using firm micro data for France and the U.S. and other countries, in particular to analyze research and development (R&D) activities and their effects on productivity. His main current topics of interest are in the economics of science, innovation and knowledge, with specific emphasis on performance evaluation at various levels of analysis, and on interactions linking individual with collective performance as well as contextual and institutional components.

== Publications ==
He has authored and/or edited several books, and published in journals such as American Economic Review, European Economic Review, Journal of Econometrics, and Review of Economics and Statistics, among others. A selection:

- Griliches, Zvi, and Jacques Mairesse (1983): Comparing productivity growth: An exploration of French and U.S. industrial and firm data, European Economic Review, 21(1–2), 89–119.
- Griliches, Zvi, and Jacques Mairesse (1993): Productivity issues in services at the micro level, Boston: Kluwer Academic Publishers.
- Hall, Bronwyn, and Jacques Mairesse (1995): Exploring the relationship between R&D and productivity in French manufacturing firms, Journal of Econometrics, 65(1), 263–293.
- Crépon, Bruno, Emmanuel Duguet, and Jacques Mairesse (1998): Research, innovation and productivity: An econometric analysis at the firm level, Economics of Innovation and New Technology, 7(2), 115–158.
- Encaoua, David, Bronwyn Hall, François Laisney, and Jacques Mairesse (2000): The Economics and Econometrics of Innovation, Amsterdam: Kluwer Academic Publishers.
- Mairesse, Jacques and Pierre Mohnen (2002): Accounting for innovation and measuring innovativeness: An illustrative framework and an application, American Economic Review, 92(2), 226–230.
- Bond, Stephen, Julie Elston, Jacques Mairesse, and Benoît Mulkay (2003): Financial factors and investment in Belgium, France, Germany and the United Kingdom: A comparison using company panel data, Review of Economics and Statistics, 85(1), 153–165.
- Lissoni, Francesco, Jacques Mairesse, Fabio Montobbio, and Michele Pezzoni (2011): Scientific productivity and academic promotion: A study on French and Italian physicists, Industrial and Corporate Change, 20(1), 253–294.
- Dobbelaere, Sabien, and Jacques Mairesse (2013): Panel data estimates of the production function and product and labor market imperfections, Journal of Applied Econometrics, 28(1), 1–46.
