= Roger Fletcher (mathematician) =

British mathematician (1939–2016)

Roger Fletcher FRS FRSE (29 January 1939 – 15 July 2016) was a British mathematician and professor at University of Dundee. He was a Fellow of the Society for Industrial and Applied Mathematics (SIAM) and was elected as a Fellow of the Royal Society in 2003.

In 2006, he won the Lagrange Prize from SIAM. In 2008, he was awarded a Royal Medal of the Royal Society of Edinburgh.

The Royal Society published his memoir in 2025.

== See also ==
- BFGS method
- Biconjugate gradient method
- Davidon–Fletcher–Powell formula
- Nonlinear conjugate gradient method

== Bibliography ==
- Practical methods of optimization, Wiley, 1987, ISBN 978-0-471-91547-8; Wiley, 2000, ISBN 978-0-471-49463-8
