= Jacques Mairesse (footballer) =

French footballer (1905–1940)

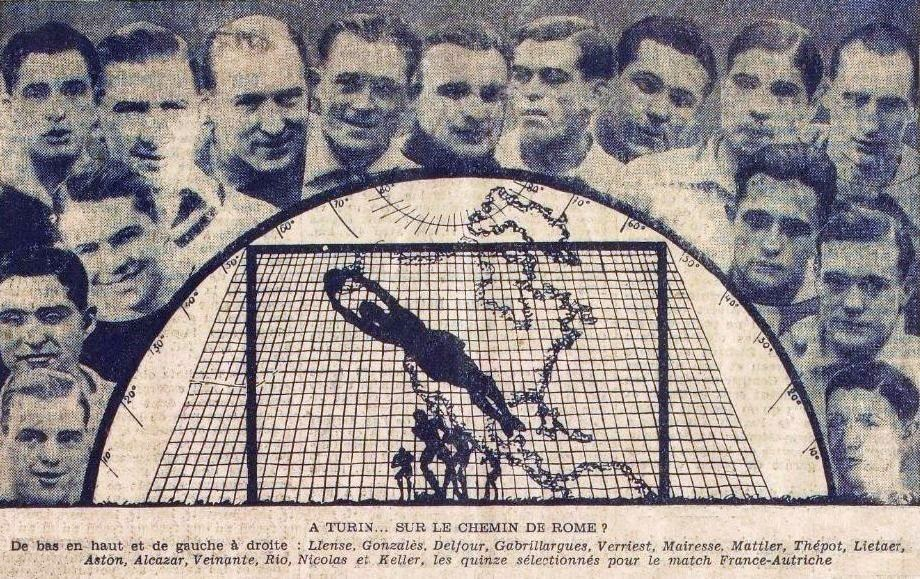
- Mairesse (sixth from the left) with the France national team in 1934

Personal information
- Full name: Jacques Désiré Mairesse
- Date of birth: 27 February 1905
- Place of birth: Paris, France
- Date of death: 15 June 1940 (aged 35)
- Place of death: Véron, France
- Height: 1.74 m (5 ft 9 in)
- Position: Defender

Senior career*
Years	Team	Apps	(Gls)
1926–1927	FC Cette		
1927–1932	FC Sète		
1932–1935	Red Star		
1935–1936	AS Villeurbanne		
1936–1939	Strasbourg		

International career
1927–1934	France	6	(0)
- * Club domestic league appearances and goals

Jacques Désiré Mairesse (27 February 1905 – 15 June 1940) was a French footballer who played as a defender. At club level, he represented FC Sète, Red Star, AS Villeurbanne, and RC Strasbourg. He earned six caps for the France national team and played in the 1934 FIFA World Cup finals. He was also part of France's squad for the 1928 Summer Olympics, but he did not play in any matches.

Mobilized in 1940, during the Battle of France he was taken prisoner by German forces in battle at Veron, and then was shot and killed while trying to escape on 13 June 1940.

His posthumous son, born on 16 August 1940 (just two months after the elder Mairesse's execution) and also named Jacques Mairesse, became a noted economist.
