= Monkey saddle =

Mathematical surface

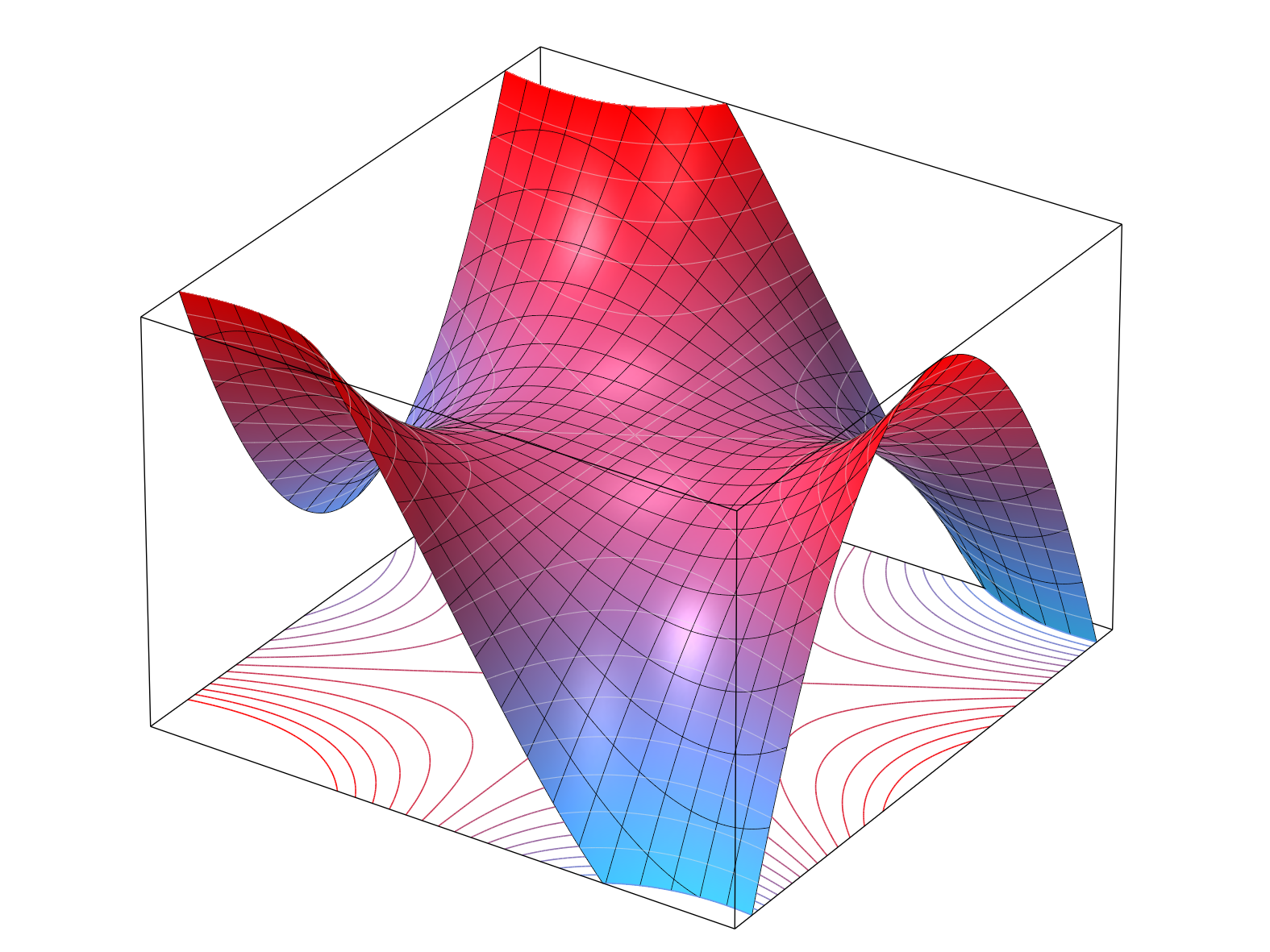
The monkey saddle

In mathematics, the monkey saddle is the surface defined by the equation

$$z = x^3 - 3xy^2, \,$$

or in cylindrical coordinates

$$z = \rho^3 \cos(3\varphi).$$

It belongs to the class of saddle surfaces, and its name derives from the observation that a saddle used by a monkey would require two depressions for its legs and one for its tail. The point $(0,0,0)$ on the monkey saddle corresponds to a degenerate critical point of the function $z(x,y)$ at $(0, 0)$. The monkey saddle has an isolated umbilical point with zero Gaussian curvature at the origin, while the curvature is strictly negative at all other points.

One can relate the rectangular and cylindrical equations using complex numbers $x+iy = r e^{i\varphi}:$

$$z = x^3 - 3xy^2 = \operatorname{Re} [(x+iy)^3] = \operatorname{Re}[r^3 e^{3i\varphi}] = r^3\cos(3\varphi).$$

By replacing 3 in the cylindrical equation with any integer $k \geq 1,$ one can create a saddle with $k$ depressions.

Another orientation of the monkey saddle is the Smelt petal defined by $x+y+z+xyz=0,$ so that the z-axis of the monkey saddle corresponds to the direction $(1,1,1)$ in the Smelt petal.

Another function, which has not three but four areas - in each quadrant of the $\mathbb R^2$, in which the function goes to minus infinity, is given by $z = x^4 - 6x^2y^2 + y^4$.

Smelt petal: x + y + z + xyz = 0

== Horse saddle ==
The term horse saddle may be used in contrast to monkey saddle, to designate an ordinary saddle surface in which z(x,y) has a saddle point, a local minimum or maximum in every direction of the xy-plane. In contrast, the monkey saddle has a stationary point of inflection in every direction.
