= Peano surface =

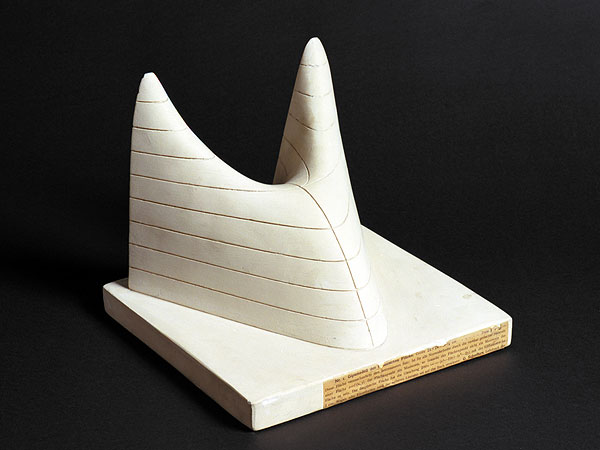
Model of the Peano surface in the Dresden collection

In mathematics, the Peano surface is the graph of the two-variable function

$$f(x,y)=(2x^2-y)(y-x^2).$$

It was proposed by Giuseppe Peano in 1899 as a counterexample to a conjectured criterion for the existence of maxima and minima of functions of two variables.

The surface was named the Peano surface (German: Peanosche Fläche) by Georg Scheffers in his 1920 book Lehrbuch der darstellenden Geometrie. It has also been called the Peano saddle.

== Properties ==
Peano surface and its level curves for level 0 (parabolas, green and purple)

The function $f(x,y)=(2x^2-y)(y-x^2)$ whose graph is the surface takes positive values between the two parabolas $y=x^2$ and $y=2x^2$, and negative values elsewhere (see diagram). At the origin, the three-dimensional point $(0,0,0)$ on the surface that corresponds to the intersection point of the two parabolas, the surface has a saddle point. The surface itself has positive Gaussian curvature in some parts and negative curvature in others, separated by another parabola, implying that its Gauss map has a Whitney cusp.

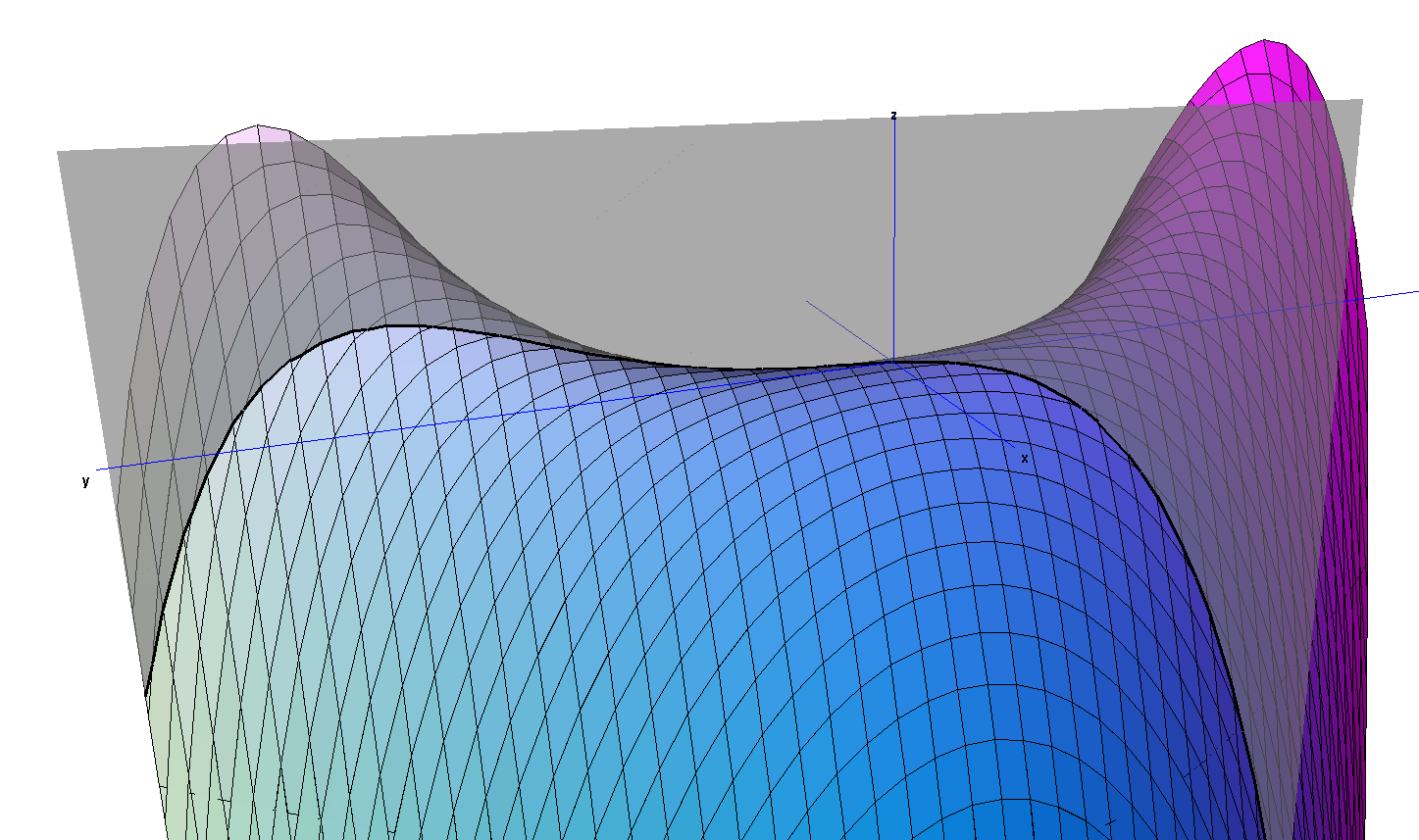
Intersection of the Peano surface with a vertical plane. The intersection curve has a local maximum at the origin, to the right of the image, and a global maximum on the left of the image, dipping shallowly between these two points.

Although the surface does not have a local maximum at the origin, its intersection with any vertical plane through the origin (a plane with equation $y=mx$ or $x=0$) is a curve that has a local maximum at the origin, a property described by Earle Raymond Hedrick as "paradoxical". In other words, if a point starts at the origin $(0,0)$ of the plane, and moves away from the origin along any straight line, the value of $(2x^2-y)(y-x^2)$ will decrease at the start of the motion. Nevertheless, $(0,0)$ is not a local maximum of the function, because moving along a parabola such as $y=\sqrt{2}\,x^2$ (in diagram: red) will cause the function value to increase.

The Peano surface is a quartic surface.

== As a counterexample ==
In 1886 Joseph Alfred Serret published a textbook with a proposed criterion for the extremal points of a surface given by $z=f(x_0+h,y_0+k)$

"the maximum or the minimum takes place when for the values of $h$ and $k$ for which $d^2f$ and $d^3f$ (third and fourth terms) vanish, $d^4f$ (fifth term) has constantly the sign − , or the sign +."

Here, it is assumed that the linear terms vanish and the Taylor series of $f$ has the form $z=f(x_0,y_0)+Q(h,k)+C(h,k)+F(h,k)+\cdots$ where $Q(h,k)$ is a quadratic form like $a h^2+b h k+c k^2$, $C(h,k)$ is a cubic form with cubic terms in $h$ and $k$, and $F(h,k)$ is a quartic form with a homogeneous quartic polynomial in $h$ and $k$. Serret proposes that if $F(h,k)$ has constant sign for all points where $Q(h,k)=C(h,k)=0$ then there is a local maximum or minimum of the surface at $(x_0,y_0)$.

In his 1884 notes to Angelo Genocchi's Italian textbook on calculus, Calcolo differenziale e principii di calcolo integrale, Peano had already provided different correct conditions for a function to attain a local minimum or local maximum. In the 1899 German translation of the same textbook, he provided this surface as a counterexample to Serret's condition. At the point $(0,0,0)$, Serret's conditions are met, but this point is a saddle point, not a local maximum. A related condition to Serret's was also criticized by Ludwig Scheeffer, who used Peano's surface as a counterexample to it in an 1890 publication, credited to Peano.

== Models ==
Models of Peano's surface are included in the Göttingen Collection of Mathematical Models and Instruments at the University of Göttingen, and in the mathematical model collection of TU Dresden (in two different models). The Göttingen model was the first new model added to the collection after World War I, and one of the last added to the collection overall.
