= Curve sketching =

Graph of the function 3x^{3}-5x^{2}+8 (black) and its first (9x^{2}-10x, red) and second (18x-10, blue) derivatives. An x value where the y value of the red, or the blue, curve vanishes (becomes 0) gives rise to a local extremum (marked "HP", "TP"), or an inflection point ("WP"), of the black curve, respectively.

In geometry, curve sketching (or curve tracing) are techniques for producing a rough idea of overall shape of a plane curve given its equation, without computing the large numbers of points required for a detailed plot. It is an application of the theory of curves to find their main features.

== Basic techniques ==
The following are usually easy to carry out and give important clues as to the shape of a curve:

- Determine the x and y intercepts of the curve. The x intercepts are found by setting y equal to 0 in the equation of the curve and solving for x. Similarly, the y intercepts are found by setting x equal to 0 in the equation of the curve and solving for y.
- Determine the symmetry of the curve. If the exponent of x is always even in the equation of the curve then the y-axis is an axis of symmetry for the curve. Similarly, if the exponent of y is always even in the equation of the curve then the x-axis is an axis of symmetry for the curve. If the sum of the degrees of x and y in each term is always even or always odd, then the curve is symmetric about the origin and the origin is called a center of the curve.
- Determine any bounds on the values of x and y.
- If the curve passes through the origin then determine the tangent lines there. For algebraic curves, this can be done by removing all but the terms of lowest order from the equation and solving.
- Similarly, removing all but the terms of highest order from the equation and solving gives the points where the curve meets the line at infinity.
- Determine the asymptotes of the curve. Also determine from which side the curve approaches the asymptotes and where the asymptotes intersect the curve.
- Equate first and second derivatives to 0 to find the stationary points and inflection points respectively. If the equation of the curve cannot be solved explicitly for x or y, finding these derivatives requires implicit differentiation.

== Newton's diagram ==
Newton's diagram (also known as Newton's parallelogram, after Isaac Newton) is a technique for determining the shape of an algebraic curve close to and far away from the origin. It consists of plotting (α, β) for each term Ax^{α}y^{β} in the equation of the curve. The resulting diagram is then analyzed to produce information about the curve.

Specifically, draw a diagonal line connecting two points on the diagram so that every other point is either on or to the right and above it. There is at least one such line if the curve passes through the origin. Let the equation of the line be qα+pβ=r. Suppose the curve is approximated by y=Cx^{p/q} near the origin. Then the term Ax^{α}y^{β} is approximately Dx^{α+βp/q}. The exponent is r/q when (α, β) is on the line and higher when it is above and to the right. Therefore, the significant terms near the origin under this assumption are only those lying on the line and the others may be ignored; it produces a simple approximate equation for the curve. There may be several such diagonal lines, each corresponding to one or more branches of the curve, and the approximate equations of the branches may be found by applying this method to each line in turn.

For example, the folium of Descartes is defined by the equation

$$x^3 + y^3 - 3 a x y = 0 \,$$.

Then Newton's diagram has points at (3, 0), (1, 1), and (0, 3). Two diagonal lines may be drawn as described above, 2α+β=3 and α+2β=3. These produce

$$x^2 - 3 a y = 0 \,$$
$$y^2 - 3 a x = 0 \,$$

as approximate equations for the horizontal and vertical branches of the curve where they cross at the origin.

== The analytical triangle ==
De Gua extended Newton's diagram to form a technique called the analytical triangle (or de Gua's triangle). The points (α, β) are plotted as with Newton's diagram method but the line α+β=n, where n is the degree of the curve, is added to form a triangle which contains the diagram. This method considers all lines which bound the smallest convex polygon which contains the plotted points (see convex hull).

== Applications ==
- Streamline tracing in fluid dynamics

== See also ==
- Curve
- Locus
- Algebraic curve
- Parent function
- Numerical continuation
- Marching cubes
- Boundary tracing
- Triangle strip
