= Hyperflex =

Hyperflex may refer to:

- Flexion, in anatomy
- Inflection point of a curve where the tangent meets to order at least 4, in mathematics
