= Three-dimensional graph =

A three-dimensional graph may refer to

- A graph (discrete mathematics), embedded into a three-dimensional space
- The graph of a function of two variables, embedded into a three-dimensional space
