= Interior extremum theorem =

About maxima and minima of functions

A differentiable function graph with lines tangent to the minimum and maximum. The interior extremum theorem guarantees that these lines will always be horizontal.

In calculus and real analysis, the interior extremum theorem states that any local extremum of a real function at which it is differentiable is a stationary point. It is also known as Fermat's theorem, named after the French mathematician Pierre de Fermat.

The interior extremum theorem gives a necessary, but not sufficient condition for local extrema at which the function is differentiable, as some stationary points are not local extrema.

The second derivative, if non-zero, can be used to determine whether a local extremum at which the function is twice differentiable is a maximum or a minimum. However, the second derivative can be zero at local extrema.

== History ==
Pierre de Fermat proposed in a collection of treatises titled Maxima et minima a method to find maximum or minimum, similar to the modern interior extremum theorem using an approach he called adequality. After Marin Mersenne passed the treatises onto René Descartes, Descartes was doubtful, remarking "if [...] he speaks of wanting to send you still more papers, I beg of you to ask him to think them out more carefully than those preceding". Descartes later agreed that the method was valid.

== Statement ==
One way to state the interior extremum theorem is that, if a function has a local extremum at some point and is differentiable there, then the function's derivative at that point must be zero. In precise mathematical language:

Let $f\colon (a,b) \rightarrow \mathbb{R}$ be a function from an open interval $(a,b)$ to $\R$, and suppose that $x_0 \in (a,b)$ is a point where $f$ has a local extremum. If $f$ is differentiable at $x_0$, then $f'(x_0) = 0$.

Another way to understand the theorem is via the contrapositive statement: if the derivative of a function at any point is not zero, then there is not a local extremum at that point. Formally:

If $f$ is differentiable at $x_0 \in (a,b)$, and $f'(x_0) \neq 0$, then $x_0$ is not a local extremum of $f$.

=== Corollary ===
Every global extremum of a function f on a domain A occurs only at the boundary of A, non-differentiable points, or stationary points. If $x_0$ is a global extremum of f, then one of the following is true:

- boundary: $x_0$ is in the boundary of A
- non-differentiable: f is not differentiable at $x_0$
- stationary point: $f'(x_0)=0$

The function $f(x)=x^3$ has no extrema. The function $f(x)=x^3-x$ has no global extrema, although it has local extrema.

=== Extension ===
A similar statement holds for the partial derivatives of multivariate functions. Suppose that some real-valued function of the real numbers $f = f(t_1, t_2, \ldots,t_k)$ has an extremum at a point $C$, defined by $C = (a_1, a_2,\ldots ,a_k)$. If $f$ is differentiable at $C$, then:
$$\frac{\partial}{\partial t_i}f(C)=0$$
for each $i = 1, 2, \ldots ,k$.

The statement can also be extended to differentiable manifolds. If $f : M \to \mathbb{R}$ is a differentiable function on a manifold $M$, then its local extrema must be critical points of $f$, in particular points where the exterior derivative $df$ is zero.

== Applications ==
The interior extremum theorem is central for determining maxima and minima of piecewise differentiable functions of one variable: an extremum is either a stationary point (that is, a zero of the derivative), a non-differentiable point (that is a point where the function is not differentiable), or a boundary point of the domain of the function. Since the number of these points is typically finite, the computation of the values of the function at these points provides the maximum and the minimum, simply by comparing the obtained values.

== Proof ==
Suppose that $f$ has a local maximum at $x_0$. (A similar argument applies for a local minimum.) Then there is some neighbourhood around $x_0$ such that $f(x_0) \ge f(x)$ for all $x$ within that neighborhood. If $x > x_0$, then the difference quotient $\frac{f(x) - f(x_0)}{x - x_0}$ is non-positive for $x$ in this neighborhood. This implies
$$\lim_{x\rightarrow x_0^+}\frac{f(x) - f(x_0)}{x - x_0} \le 0.$$
Similarly, if $x < x_0$, then the difference quotient is non-negative, and so
$$\lim_{x\rightarrow x_0^-}\frac{f(x) - f(x_0)}{x - x_0} \geq 0.$$
Since $f$ is differentiable, the above limits must both be equal to $f'(x_0)$. This is only possible if both limits are equal to 0, so $f'(x_0) = 0$.

== See also ==
- Optimization (mathematics)
- arg max
