= Hessian equation =

In mathematics, k-Hessian equations (or Hessian equations for short) are partial differential equations (PDEs) based on the Hessian matrix. More specifically, a Hessian equation is the k-trace, or the kth elementary symmetric polynomial of eigenvalues of the Hessian matrix. When k ≥ 2, the k-Hessian equation is a fully nonlinear partial differential equation. It can be written as ${\cal S}_k[u]=f$, where $1\leqslant k \leqslant n$, ${\cal S}_k[u]=\sigma_k(\lambda({\cal D}^2u))$, and $\lambda({\cal D}^2u)=(\lambda_1,\cdots,\lambda_n)$, are the eigenvalues of the Hessian matrix ${\cal D}^2u=[\partial_i \partial_ju]_{1\leq i,j \leq n}$ and $\sigma_k(\lambda)=\sum_{i_1<\cdots<i_k}\lambda_{i_1}\cdots\lambda_{i_k}$, is a $k$ th elementary symmetric polynomial.

Much like differential equations often study the actions of differential operators (e.g. elliptic operators and elliptic equations), Hessian equations can be understood as simply eigenvalue equations acted upon by the Hessian differential operator. Special cases include the Monge–Ampère equation and Poisson's equation (the Laplacian being the trace of the Hessian matrix). The 2−hessian operator also appears in conformal mapping problems. In fact, the 2−hessian equation is unfamiliar outside Riemannian geometry and elliptic regularity theory, that is closely related to the scalar curvature operator, which provides an intrinsic curvature for a three-dimensional manifold.

These equations are of interest in geometric PDEs (a subfield at the interface between both geometric analysis and PDEs) and differential geometry.
