= Parent function =

In mathematics, a parent function is the core representation of a function type without manipulations such as translation and dilation. For example, for the family of quadratic functions having the general form

$$y = ax^2 + bx + c\,,$$

the simplest function is

$$y = x^2$$,

and every quadratic may be converted to that form by translations and dilations, which may be seen by completing the square. This is therefore the parent function of the family of quadratic equations.

For linear and quadratic functions, the graph of any function can be obtained from the graph of the parent function by simple translations and stretches parallel to the axes. For example, the graph of y = x^{2} − 4x + 7 can be obtained from the graph of y = x^{2} by translating +2 units along the X axis and +3 units along Y axis. This is because the equation can also be written as y − 3 = (x − 2)^{2}.

For many trigonometric functions, the parent function is usually a basic sin(x), cos(x), or tan(x). For example, the graph of y = A sin(x) + B cos(x) can be obtained from the graph of y = sin(x) by translating it through an angle α along the positive X axis (where tan(α) = A/B), then stretching it parallel to the Y axis using a stretch factor R, where R^{2} = A^{2} + B^{2}. This is because A sin(x) + B cos(x) can be written as R sin(x−α) (see List of trigonometric identities). Alternatively, the parent function may be interpreted as cos(x).

The concept of parent function is less clear or inapplicable polynomials of higher degree because of the extra turning points, but for the family of n-degree polynomial functions for any given n, the parent function is sometimes taken as x^{n}, or, to simplify further, x^{2} when n is even and x^{3} for odd n. Turning points may be established by differentiation to provide more detail of the graph.

== See also ==
- Curve sketching
