= Tetraview =

A tetraview is an attempt to graph a complex function of a complex variable, by a method invented by Davide P. Cervone.

A graph of a real function of a real variable is the set of ordered pairs (x,y) such that y = f(x). This is the ordinary two-dimensional Cartesian graph studied in school algebra.

Every complex number has both a real part and an imaginary part, so one complex variable is two-dimensional and a BBC pair of complex variables is four-dimensional. A tetraview is an attempt to give a picture of a four-dimensional object using a two-dimensional representation—either on a piece of paper or on a computer screen, showing a still picture consisting of five views, one in the center and one at each corner. This is roughly analogous to a picture of a three-dimensional object by giving a front view, a side view, and a view from above.

A picture of a three-dimensional object is a projection of that object from three dimensions into two dimensions. A tetraview is set of five projections, first from four dimensions into three dimensions, and then from three dimensions into two dimensions.

A complex function w = f(z), where z = a + bi and w = c + di are complex numbers, has a graph in four-space (four dimensional space) R^{4} consisting of all points (a, b, c, d) such that c + di = f(a + bi).

To construct a tetraview, we begin with the four points (1,0,0,0), (0, 1, 0, 0), (0, 0, 1, 0), and (0, 0, 0, 1), which are vertices of a spherical tetrahedron on the unit three-sphere S^{3} in R^{4}.

We project the four-dimensional graph onto the three-dimensional sphere along one of the four coordinate axes, and then give a two-dimensional picture of the resulting three-dimensional graph. This provides the four corner graph. The graph in the center is a similar picture "taken" from the point of view of the origin.
