= First variation =

Mathematical theory

In applied mathematics and the calculus of variations, the first variation of a functional J(y) is defined as the linear functional $\delta J(y)$ mapping the function h to

$$\delta J(y,h) = \lim_{\varepsilon\to 0} \frac{J(y + \varepsilon h)-J(y)}{\varepsilon} = \left.\frac{\mathrm{d}}{\mathrm{d}\varepsilon} J(y + \varepsilon h)\right|_{\varepsilon = 0},$$

where y and h are functions, and ε is a scalar. This is recognizable as the Gateaux derivative of the functional.

== Example ==
Compute the first variation of

$$J(y)=\int_a^b yy' \mathrm{d}x.$$

From the definition above:

$$\begin{align}
\delta J(y,h)&=\left.\frac{\mathrm{d}}{\mathrm{d}\varepsilon} J(y + \varepsilon h)\right|_{\varepsilon = 0}\\
&= \left.\frac{\mathrm{d}}{\mathrm{d}\varepsilon} \int_a^b (y + \varepsilon h)(y^\prime + \varepsilon h^\prime) \ \mathrm{d}x\right|_{\varepsilon = 0}\\
&= \left.\frac{\mathrm{d}}{\mathrm{d}\varepsilon} \int_a^b (yy^\prime + y\varepsilon h^\prime + y^\prime\varepsilon h + \varepsilon^2 hh^\prime) \ \mathrm{d}x\right|_{\varepsilon = 0}\\
&= \left.\int_a^b \frac{\mathrm{d}}{\mathrm{d}\varepsilon} (yy^\prime + y\varepsilon h^\prime + y^\prime\varepsilon h + \varepsilon^2 hh^\prime) \ \mathrm{d}x \right|_{\varepsilon = 0}\\
&= \left.\int_a^b (yh^\prime + y^\prime h + 2\varepsilon hh^\prime) \ \mathrm{d}x\right|_{\varepsilon = 0}\\
&= \int_a^b (yh^\prime + y^\prime h) \ \mathrm{d}x \\
\end{align}$$

== See also ==
- Calculus of variations
- Functional derivative
- Second variation
