= Ludwig Scheeffer =

German mathematician and university teacher

Karl Ludwig Scheeffer
- Born: June 1, 1859; Königsberg
- Died: June 11, 1885 (aged 26); Munich
- Education: Friedrich Wilhelm University of Berlin, Ludwig-Maximilians-Universität München
- Scientific career
- Theses: Ueber Bewegungen starrer Punktsysteme in einer ebenen n-fachen Mannigfaltigkeit (On motions of rigid point systems in a plane n-fold manifold) (1880); Ueber einige bestimmte Integrale, betrachtet als Funktionen eines komplexen Parameters (On Some Definite Integrals Considered as Functions of a Complex Parameter) (1883/4)

Karl Ludwig Scheeffer (born 1 June 1859 in Königsberg; died 11 June 1885 in Munich) was a German mathematician and university teacher.

== Life ==
Scheeffer's parents were the protestants Ludwig and Mathilda, née Broscheit. He first attended a Gymnasium in Königsberg and after his father's death transferred to the Friedrichs-Gymnasium Berlin.

In 1875, he was accepted at the Friedrich Wilhelm University of Berlin, where he studied for four years, except two semesters at Heidelberg University and Leipzig University. On 1 March 1880, he finally received his doctorate from the Friedrich Wilhelm University of Berlin with the dissertation "Ueber Bewegungen starrer Punktsysteme in einer ebenen n-fachen Mannigfaltigkeit (On motions of rigid point systems in a plane n-fold manifold)". Since initially he did not strive for a university career, he passed the necessary examination for the teaching profession in the subjects of mathematics, physics, philosophical propaedeutics and descriptive natural sciences. After this, he began his pedagogical probationary year at the Friedrich Wilhelm Gymnasium in Berlin at Easter 1881.

During his pedagogical probationary year, Scheeffer realized that he would like to devote his creative energy to science after all. After a trip to the Alps, which was necessary for health reasons, he moved to the Ludwig-Maximilians-Universität München. There he habilitated in 1883 or 1884 with the paper "Ueber einige bestimmte Integrale, betrachtet als Funktionen eines komplexen Parameters (On Some Definite Integrals Considered as Functions of a Complex Parameter)" and subsequently became a Privatdozent. While residing in the Briennerstraße, He lectured about "Elements of differential and integral calculus", in the winter term 1884/1885, and on "Selected topic in integral calculus" and "Synthetic geometry" in the summer term 1885, At the age of 26, he died of typhoid fever. Despite the brevity of his life and academic activity, he published a number of important writings and essays.

== Selected publications ==
- Scheeffer, Ludwig (1880). Ueber Bewegungen starrer Punktsysteme in einer ebenen n-fachen Mannigfaltigkeit [On motions of rigid point systems in a planar n-fold manifold] (Ph.D. thesis) (in German). Humboldt University of Berlin.
- Ueber einige bestimmte Integrale, betrachtet als Funktionen eines komplexen Parameters. Dreijer, Berlin 1883.
- Ludwig Scheeffer (Mar 1884). "Beweis des Laurent'schen Satzes" [Proof of Laurent's Theorem] (PDF). Acta Mathematica (in German). 4: 375–380.
- Ludwig Scheeffer (1884). "Allgemeine Untersuchungen über Rectification der Curven" [General studies on rectification of curves]. Acta Mathematica (in German). 5: 49–82.
- Ludwig Scheeffer (1884). "Zur Theorie der stetigen Funktionen einer reellen Veränderlichen" [On the theory of continuous functions of a real variable]. Acta Mathematica (in German). 5: 183–194. (Part I) — Part II (p. 279–296)
- Ludwig Scheeffer (1885). "Die Maxima und Minima der einfachen Integrale zwischen festen Grenzen" [The maxima and minima of the simple integrals between fixed limits]. Mathematische Annalen (in German). 25 (4): 522–593.
- Ludwig Scheeffer (1885). "Über die Bedeutung der Begriffe "Maximum und Minimum" in der Variationsrechnung" [On the meaning of the terms "maximum and minimum" in the calculus of variations]. Mathematische Annalen (in German). 26 (2): 197–208.

== See also ==
- Cantor function
- Peano surface
