= Truncated Newton method =

Mathematical optimization algorithms

The truncated Newton method, originated in a paper by Ron Dembo and Trond Steihaug, also known as Hessian-free optimization, are a family of optimization algorithms designed for optimizing non-linear functions with large numbers of independent variables. A truncated Newton method consists of repeated application of an iterative optimization algorithm to approximately solve Newton's equations, to determine an update to the function's parameters. The inner solver is truncated, i.e., run for only a limited number of iterations. It follows that, for truncated Newton methods to work, the inner solver needs to produce a good approximation in a finite number of iterations; conjugate gradient has been suggested and evaluated as a candidate inner loop. Another prerequisite is good preconditioning for the inner algorithm.
