= Stationary point =

Zero of the derivative of a function

The stationary points are the red circles. In this graph, they are all relative maxima or relative minima. The blue squares are inflection points.

In mathematics, particularly in calculus, a stationary point of a differentiable function of one variable is a point on the graph of the function where the function's derivative is zero. Informally, it is a point where the function "stops" increasing or decreasing (hence the name).

For a differentiable function of several real variables, a stationary point is a point on the surface of the graph where all its partial derivatives are zero (equivalently, the gradient has zero norm). The notion of stationary points of a real-valued function is generalized as critical points for complex-valued functions.

Stationary points are easy to visualize on the graph of a function of one variable: they correspond to the points on the graph where the tangent is horizontal (i.e., parallel to the x-axis). For a function of two variables, they correspond to the points on the graph where the tangent plane is parallel to the xy plane.

The notion of a stationary point allows the mathematical description of an astronomical phenomenon that was unexplained before the time of Copernicus. A stationary point is the point in the apparent trajectory of the planet on the celestial sphere, where the motion of the planet seems to stop, before restarting in the other direction (see apparent retrograde motion). This occurs because of the projection of the planet orbit into the ecliptic circle.

== Turning points ==
A turning point of a differentiable function is a point at which the derivative has an isolated zero and changes sign at the point. A turning point may be either a relative maximum or a relative minimum (also known as local minimum and maximum). A turning point is thus a stationary point, but not all stationary points are turning points. If the function is twice differentiable, the isolated stationary points that are not turning points are horizontal inflection points. For example, the function $x \mapsto x^3$ has a stationary point at x = 0, which is also an inflection point, but is not a turning point.

== Classification ==
A graph in which local extrema and global extrema have been labeled.

Isolated stationary points of a $C^1$ real valued function $f\colon \mathbb{R} \to \mathbb{R}$ are classified into four kinds, by the first derivative test:

- a local minimum (minimal turning point or relative minimum) is one where the derivative of the function changes from negative to positive;
- a local maximum (maximal turning point or relative maximum) is one where the derivative of the function changes from positive to negative;

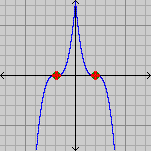
Saddle points (stationary points that are neither local maxima nor minima: they are inflection points. The left is a "rising point of inflection" (derivative is positive on both sides of the red point); the right is a "falling point of inflection" (derivative is negative on both sides of the red point).

- a rising point of inflection (or inflexion) is one where the derivative of the function is positive on both sides of the stationary point; such a point marks a change in concavity;
- a falling point of inflection (or inflexion) is one where the derivative of the function is negative on both sides of the stationary point; such a point marks a change in concavity.

The first two options are collectively known as "local extrema". Similarly a point that is either a global (or absolute) maximum or a global (or absolute) minimum is called a global (or absolute) extremum. The last two options—stationary points that are not local extrema—are known as saddle points.

By Fermat's theorem, global extrema must occur (for a $C^1$ function) on the boundary or at stationary points.

== Curve sketching ==
The roots, stationary points, inflection point and concavity of a cubic polynomial x^{3} − 6x^{2} + 9x − 4 (solid black curve) and its first (dashed red) and second (dotted orange) derivatives.

Determining the position and nature of stationary points aids in curve sketching of differentiable functions. Solving the equation f′(x) = 0 returns the x-coordinates of all stationary points; the y-coordinates are trivially the function values at those x-coordinates. The specific nature of a stationary point at x can in some cases be determined by examining the second derivative f″(x):

- If f″(x) < 0, the stationary point at x is concave down; a maximal extremum.
- If f″(x) > 0, the stationary point at x is concave up; a minimal extremum.
- If f″(x) = 0, the nature of the stationary point must be determined by way of other means, often by noting a sign change around that point.

A more straightforward way of determining the nature of a stationary point is by examining the function values between the stationary points (if the function is defined and continuous between them).

A simple example of a point of inflection is the function f(x) = x^{3}. There is a clear change of concavity about the point x = 0, and we can prove this by means of calculus. The second derivative of f is the everywhere-continuous 6x, and at x = 0, f″ = 0, and the sign changes about this point. So x = 0 is a point of inflection.

More generally, the stationary points of a real valued function $f\colon \mathbb{R}^{n} \to \mathbb{R}$ are those points x_{0} where the derivative in every direction equals zero, or equivalently, the gradient is zero.

=== Examples ===
For the function f(x) = x^{4} we have f′(0) = 0 and f″(0) = 0. Even though f″(0) = 0, this point is not a point of inflection. The reason is that the sign of f′(x) changes from negative to positive.

For the function f(x) = sin(x) we have f′(0) ≠ 0 and f″(0) = 0. But this is not a stationary point, rather it is a point of inflection. This is because the concavity changes from concave downwards to concave upwards and the sign of f′(x) does not change; it stays positive.

For the function f(x) = x^{3} we have f′(0) = 0 and f″(0) = 0. This is both a stationary point and a point of inflection. This is because the concavity changes from concave downwards to concave upwards and the sign of f′(x) does not change; it stays positive.

For the function f(x) = 0, one has f′(0) = 0 and f″(0) = 0. The point 0 is a non-isolated stationary point which is not a turning point nor a horizontal point of inflection as the signs of f′(x) and f″(x) do not change.

The function f(x) = x^{5} sin(1/x) for x ≠ 0, and f(0) = 0, gives an example where f′(x) and f″(x) are both continuous, f′(0) = 0 and f″(0) = 0, and yet f(x) does not have a local maximum, a local minimum, nor a point of inflection at 0. So, 0 is a stationary point that is not isolated.

== See also ==
- Optimization (mathematics)
- Fermat's theorem
- Derivative test
- Fixed point (mathematics)
- Saddle point
