= Saddle point =

Critical point on a surface graph which is not a local extremum

A saddle point (in red) on the graph of z = x^{2} − y^{2} (hyperbolic paraboloid)

In mathematics, a saddle point or minimax point is a point on the surface of the graph of a function where the slopes (derivatives) in orthogonal directions are all zero (a critical point), but which is not a local extremum of the function. An example of a saddle point is when there is a critical point with a relative minimum along one axial direction (between peaks) and a relative maximum along the crossing axis. However, a saddle point need not be in this form. For example, the function $f(x,y) = x^2 + y^3$ has a critical point at $(0, 0)$ that is a saddle point since it is neither a relative maximum nor relative minimum, but it does not have a relative maximum or relative minimum in the $y$-direction.

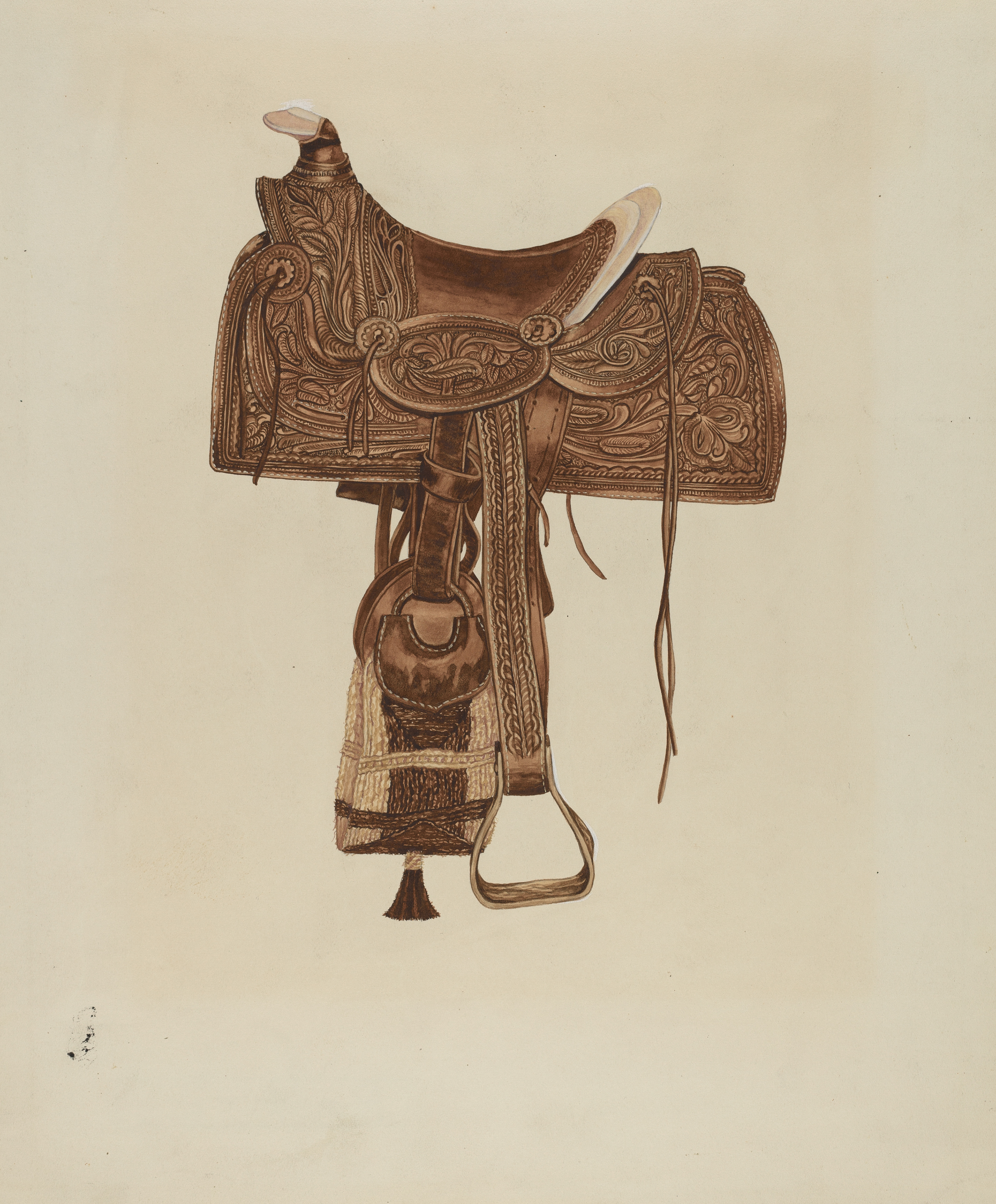
A riding saddle

The name derives from the fact that the prototypical example in two dimensions is a surface that curves up in one direction, and curves down in a different direction, resembling a riding saddle. In terms of contour lines, a saddle point in two dimensions gives rise to a contour map with, in principle, a pair of lines intersecting at the point. Such intersections are rare in contour maps drawn with discrete contour lines, such as ordnance survey maps, as the height of the saddle point is unlikely to coincide with the integer multiples used in such maps. Instead, the saddle point appears as a blank space in the middle of four sets of contour lines that approach and veer away from it. For a basic saddle point, these sets occur in pairs, with an opposing high pair and an opposing low pair positioned in orthogonal directions. The critical contour lines generally do not have to intersect orthogonally.

Saddle point between two hills (the intersection of the figure-eight z-contour)

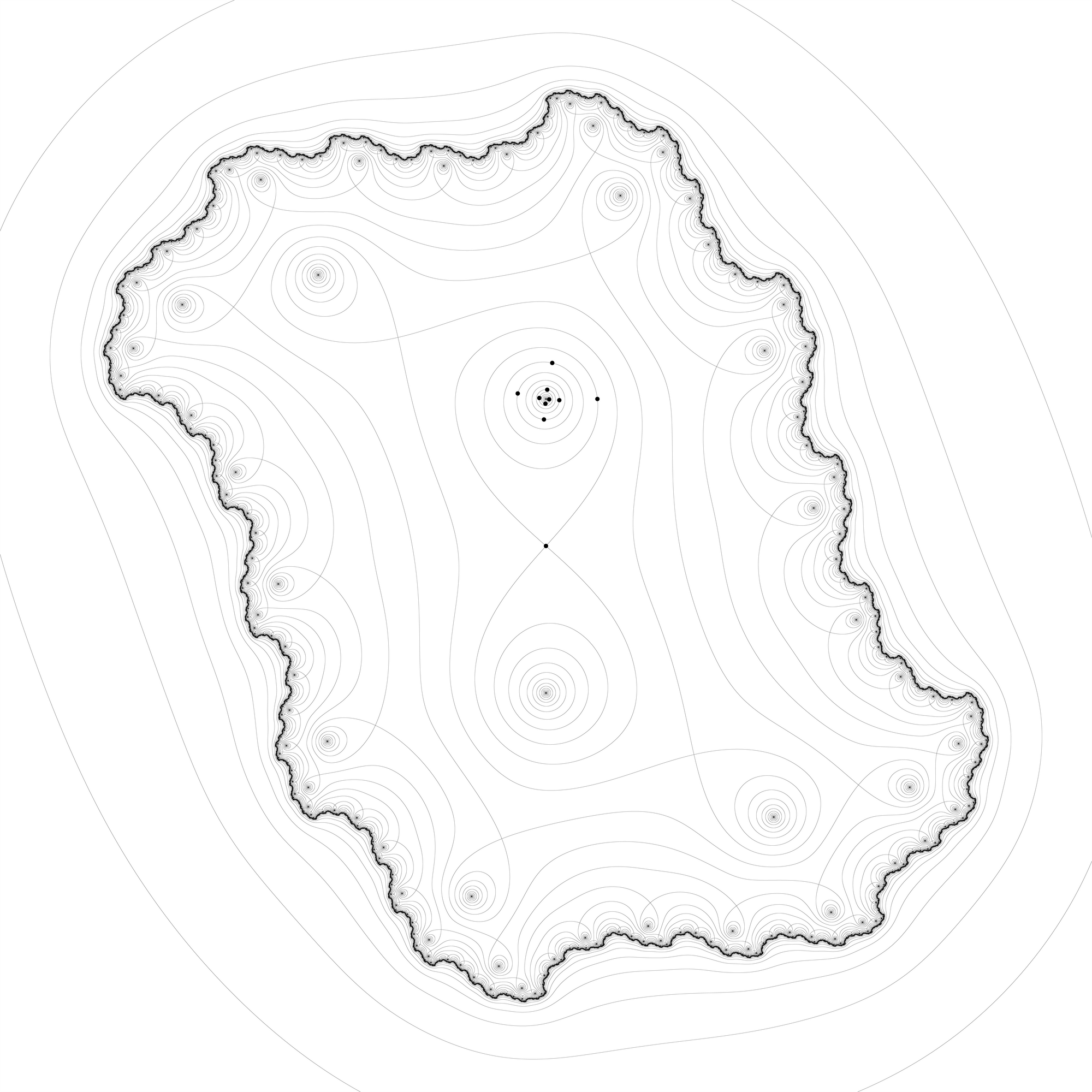
Saddle point on the contour plot is the point where level curves cross

== Mathematical discussion ==
A simple criterion for checking if a given stationary point of a real-valued function F(x,y) of two real variables is a saddle point is to compute the function's Hessian matrix at that point: if the Hessian is indefinite, then that point is a saddle point. For example, the Hessian matrix of the function $z=x^2-y^2$ at the stationary point $(x, y, z)=(0, 0, 0)$ is the matrix

$$\begin{bmatrix}
2 & 0\\
0 & -2 \\
\end{bmatrix}$$

which is indefinite. Therefore, this point is a saddle point. This criterion gives only a sufficient condition. For example, the point $(0, 0, 0)$ is a saddle point for the function $z=x^4-y^4,$ but the Hessian matrix of this function at the origin is the null matrix, which is not indefinite.

In the most general terms, a saddle point for a smooth function (whose graph is a curve, surface or hypersurface) is a stationary point such that the curve/surface/etc. in the neighborhood of that point is not entirely on any side of the tangent space at that point.

The plot of y = x^{3} with a saddle point at 0

In a domain of one dimension, a saddle point is a point which is both a stationary point and a point of inflection. Since it is a point of inflection, it is not a local extremum.

== Saddle surface ==
Hyperbolic paraboloid

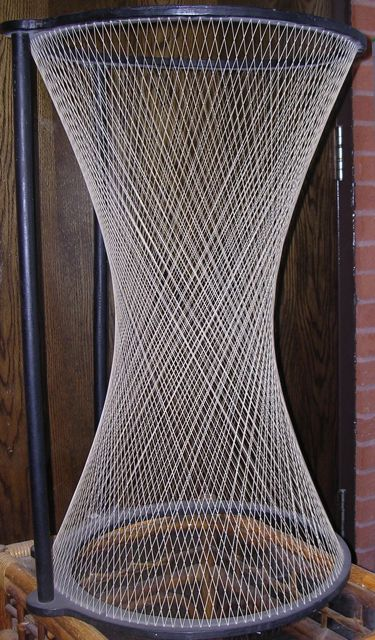
A model of an elliptic hyperboloid of one sheet

A monkey saddle

A saddle surface is a smooth surface containing one or more saddle points.

Classical examples of two-dimensional saddle surfaces in the Euclidean space are second order surfaces, the hyperbolic paraboloid $z=x^2-y^2$ (which is often referred to as "the saddle surface" or "the standard saddle surface") and the hyperboloid of one sheet. The Pringles potato chip or crisp is an everyday example of a hyperbolic paraboloid shape.

Saddle surfaces have negative Gaussian curvature which distinguish them from convex/elliptical surfaces which have positive Gaussian curvature. A classical third-order saddle surface is the monkey saddle.

== Examples ==
In a two-player zero sum game defined on a continuous space, the equilibrium point is a saddle point.

For a second-order linear autonomous system, a critical point is a saddle point if the characteristic equation has one positive and one negative real eigenvalue.

In optimization subject to equality constraints, the first-order conditions describe a saddle point of the Lagrangian.

== Other uses ==
In dynamical systems, if the dynamic is given by a differentiable map f then a point is hyperbolic if and only if the differential of ƒ ^{n} (where n is the period of the point) has no eigenvalue on the (complex) unit circle when computed at the point. Then a saddle point is a hyperbolic periodic point whose stable and unstable manifolds have a dimension that is not zero.

A saddle point of a matrix is an element which is both the largest element in its column and the smallest element in its row.

== See also ==
- Saddle-point method is an extension of Laplace's method for approximating integrals
- Maximum and minimum
- Derivative test
- Hyperbolic equilibrium point
- Hyperbolic geometry
- Minimax theorem
- Max–min inequality
- Mountain pass theorem
