= Inflection point =

Point where the curvature of a curve changes sign

Plot of y = x^{3} with an inflection point at (0,0), which is also a stationary point.

The roots, stationary points, inflection point and concavity of a cubic polynomial x^{3} − 6x^{2} + 9x − 4 (solid black curve) and its first (dashed red) and second (dotted orange) derivatives.

In differential calculus and differential geometry, an inflection point, point of inflection, flex, or inflection (rarely inflexion) is a point on a smooth plane curve at which the curvature changes sign. In particular, in the case of the graph of a function, it is a point where the function changes from being concave (concave downward) to convex (concave upward), or vice versa.

For the graph of a function f of differentiability class C^{2} (its first derivative f', and its second derivative f'', exist and are continuous), the condition f'' = 0 can also be used to find an inflection point since a point of f'' = 0 must be passed to change f'' from a positive value (convex) to a negative value (concave) or vice versa as f'' is continuous; an inflection point of the curve is where f'' = 0 and changes its sign at the point (from positive to negative or from negative to positive). A point where the second derivative vanishes but does not change its sign is sometimes called a point of undulation or undulation point.

In algebraic geometry an inflection point is defined slightly more generally, as a regular point where the tangent meets the curve to order at least 3, and an undulation point or hyperflex is defined as a point where the tangent meets the curve to order at least 4.

== Definition ==
Inflection points in differential geometry are the points of the curve where the curvature changes its sign.

For example, the graph of the differentiable function has an inflection point at (x, f(x)) if and only if its first derivative f' has an isolated extremum at x. (This is not the same as saying that f has an extremum). That is, in some neighborhood, x is the one and only point at which f' has a (local) minimum or maximum. If all extrema of f' are isolated, then an inflection point is a point on the graph of f at which the tangent crosses the curve.

A falling point of inflection is an inflection point where the derivative is negative on both sides of the point; in other words, it is an inflection point near which the function is decreasing. A rising point of inflection is a point where the derivative is positive on both sides of the point; in other words, it is an inflection point near which the function is increasing.

For a smooth curve given by parametric equations, a point is an inflection point if its signed curvature changes from plus to minus or from minus to plus, i.e., changes sign.

For a smooth curve which is a graph of a twice differentiable function, an inflection point is a point on the graph at which the second derivative has an isolated zero and changes sign.

In algebraic geometry, a non singular point of an algebraic curve is an inflection point if and only if the intersection number of the tangent line and the curve (at the point of tangency) is greater than 2. The main motivation of this different definition, is that otherwise the set of the inflection points of a curve would not be an algebraic set. In fact, the set of the inflection points of a plane algebraic curve are exactly its non-singular points that are zeros of the Hessian determinant of its projective completion.

Plot of f(x) = sin(2x) from −π/4 to 5π/4; the second derivative is f″(x) = –4sin(2x), and its sign is thus the opposite of the sign of f. Tangent is blue where the curve is convex (above its own tangent), green where concave (below its tangent), and red at inflection points: 0, π/2 and π

== Conditions ==
=== A necessary but not sufficient condition ===
For a function f, if its second derivative f″(x) exists at x_{0} and x_{0} is an inflection point for f, then f″(x_{0}) = 0, but this condition is not sufficient for having a point of inflection, even if derivatives of any order exist. In this case, one also needs the lowest-order (above the second) non-zero derivative to be of odd order (third, fifth, etc.). If the lowest-order non-zero derivative is of even order, the point is not a point of inflection, but an undulation point. However, in algebraic geometry, both inflection points and undulation points are usually called inflection points. An example of an undulation point is x = 0 for the function f given by f(x) = x^{4}.

In the preceding assertions, it is assumed that f has some higher-order non-zero derivative at x, which is not necessarily the case. If it is the case, the condition that the first nonzero derivative has an odd order implies that the sign of f'(x) is the same on either side of x in a neighborhood of x. If this sign is positive, the point is a rising point of inflection; if it is negative, the point is a falling point of inflection.

=== Sufficient conditions ===
1. A sufficient existence condition for a point of inflection in the case that f(x) is k times continuously differentiable in a certain neighborhood of a point x_{0} with k odd and k ≥ 3, is that f^{(n)}(x_{0}) = 0 for n = 2, ..., k − 1 and f^{(k)}(x_{0}) ≠ 0. Then f(x) has a point of inflection at x_{0}.
2. Another more general sufficient existence condition requires f″(x_{0} + ε) and f″(x_{0} − ε) to have opposite signs in the neighborhood of x_{0} (Bronshtein and Semendyayev 2004, p. 231).

== Categorization of points of inflection ==
y = x^{4} – x has a 2nd derivative of zero at point (0,0), but it is not an inflection point because the fourth derivative is the first higher order non-zero derivative (the third derivative is zero as well).

Points of inflection can also be categorized according to whether f'(x) is zero or nonzero.

- if f'(x) is zero, the point is a stationary point of inflection
- if f'(x) is not zero, the point is a non-stationary point of inflection

A stationary point of inflection is not a local extremum. More generally, in the context of functions of several real variables, a stationary point that is not a local extremum is called a saddle point.

An example of a stationary point of inflection is the point (0, 0) on the graph of y = x^{3}. The tangent is the x-axis, which cuts the graph at this point.

An example of a non-stationary point of inflection is the point (0, 0) on the graph of y = x^{3} + ax, for any nonzero a. The tangent at the origin is the line y = ax, which cuts the graph at this point.

== Functions with discontinuities ==
Some functions change concavity without having points of inflection. Instead, they can change concavity around vertical asymptotes or discontinuities. For example, the function $x\mapsto \frac1x$ is concave for negative x and convex for positive x, but it has no points of inflection because 0 is not in the domain of the function.

== Functions with inflection points whose second derivative does not vanish ==
Some continuous functions have an inflection point even though the second derivative is never 0. For example, the cube root function is concave upward when x is negative, and concave downward when x is positive, but has no derivatives of any order at the origin.

== See also ==
- Critical point (mathematics)
- Ecological threshold
- Hesse configuration formed by the nine inflection points of an elliptic curve
- Ogee, an architectural form with an inflection point
- Vertex (curve), a local minimum or maximum of curvature

== Sources ==
- Weisstein, Eric W. "Inflection Point". MathWorld.
- "Point of inflection", Encyclopedia of Mathematics, EMS Press, 2001 [1994]
