= Second derivative =

Mathematical operation

The second derivative of a quadratic function is constant.

In calculus, the second derivative, or the second-order derivative, of a function f is the derivative of the derivative of f. Informally, the second derivative can be phrased as "the rate of change of the rate of change"; for example, the second derivative of the position of an object with respect to time is the instantaneous acceleration of the object, or the rate at which the velocity of the object is changing with respect to time. In Leibniz notation:
$$a =  \frac{dv}{dt} = \frac{d^2 x}{dt^2},$$
where a is acceleration, v is velocity, t is time, x is position, and d is the instantaneous "delta" or change. The last expression $\tfrac{d^2 x}{dt^2}$ is the second derivative of position (x) with respect to time.

On the graph of a function, the sign of the second derivative is related to the concavity of the graph. The graph of a function with a positive second derivative is upwardly concave, while the graph of a function with a negative second derivative curves in the opposite way.

== Second derivative power rule ==
The power rule for the first derivative, if applied twice, will produce the second derivative power rule as follows:
$$\frac{d^2}{dx^2} x^n = \frac{d}{dx}\frac{d}{dx} x^n = \frac{d}{dx} \left(n x^{n-1}\right) = n \frac{d}{dx} x^{n-1} = n(n - 1)x^{n-2}.$$

== Notation ==
The second derivative of a function $f(x)$ is usually denoted $f''(x)$. That is:
$$f'' = \left(f'\right)'$$
When using Leibniz's notation for derivatives, the second derivative of a dependent variable y with respect to an independent variable x is written
$$\frac{d^2y}{dx^2}.$$
This notation is derived from the following formula:
$$\frac{d^2y}{dx^2} \,=\, \frac{d}{dx}\left(\frac{dy}{dx}\right).$$

== Example ==
Given the function
$$f(x) = x^3,$$
the derivative of f is the function
$$f'(x) = 3x^2.$$
The second derivative of f is the derivative of $f'$, namely
$$f''(x) = 6x.$$

== Relation to the graph ==
A plot of $f(x) = \sin(2x)$ from $-\pi/4$ to $5\pi/4$. The tangent line is blue where the curve is concave up, green where the curve is concave down, and red at the inflection points (0, $\pi$/2, and $\pi$).

=== Concavity ===
The second derivative of a function f can be used to determine the concavity of the graph of f. A function whose second derivative is positive is said to be concave up (also referred to as convex), meaning that the tangent line near the point where it touches the function will lie below the graph of the function. Similarly, a function whose second derivative is negative will be concave down (sometimes simply called concave), and its tangent line will lie above the graph of the function near the point of contact.

=== Inflection points ===
If the second derivative of a function changes sign, the graph of the function will switch from concave down to concave up, or vice versa. A point where this occurs is called an inflection point. Assuming the second derivative is continuous, it must take a value of zero at any inflection point, although not every point where the second derivative is zero is necessarily a point of inflection.

=== Second derivative test ===
The relation between the second derivative and the graph can be used to test whether a stationary point for a function (i.e., a point where $f'(x) = 0$) is a local maximum or a local minimum. Specifically,

- If $f''(x) < 0$, then $f$ has a local maximum at $x$.
- If $f''(x) > 0$, then $f$ has a local minimum at $x$.
- If $f''(x) = 0$, the second derivative test says nothing about the point $x$, a possible inflection point.

The reason the second derivative produces these results can be seen by way of a real-world analogy. Consider a vehicle that at first is moving forward at a great velocity, but with a negative acceleration. Clearly, the position of the vehicle at the point where the velocity reaches zero will be the maximum distance from the starting position – after this time, the velocity will become negative and the vehicle will reverse. The same is true for the minimum, with a vehicle that at first has a very negative velocity but positive acceleration.

== Limit ==
It is possible to write a single limit for the second derivative:
$$f''(x) = \lim_{h \to 0} \frac{f(x+h) - 2f(x) + f(x-h)}{h^2}.$$

The limit is called the second symmetric derivative. The second symmetric derivative may exist even when the (usual) second derivative does not.

The expression on the right can be written as a difference quotient of difference quotients:
$$\frac{f(x+h) - 2f(x) + f(x-h)}{h^2} = \frac{\dfrac{f(x+h) - f(x)}{h} - \dfrac{f(x) - f(x-h)}{h}}{h}.$$
This limit can be viewed as a continuous version of the second difference for sequences.

However, the existence of the above limit does not mean that the function $f$ has a second derivative. The limit above just gives a possibility for calculating the second derivative—but does not provide a definition. A counterexample is the sign function $\sgn(x)$, which is defined as:
$$\sgn(x) = \begin{cases}
-1 & \text{if } x < 0, \\
0 & \text{if } x = 0, \\
1 & \text{if } x > 0.
\end{cases}$$

The sign function is not continuous at zero, and therefore the second derivative for $x = 0$ does not exist. But the above limit exists for $x = 0$:
$$\begin{align}
\lim_{h \to 0} \frac{\sgn(0+h) - 2\sgn(0) + \sgn(0-h)}{h^2}
&= \lim_{h \to 0} \frac{\sgn(h) - 2\cdot 0 + \sgn(-h)}{h^2} \\
&= \lim_{h \to 0} \frac{\sgn(h) + (-\sgn(h))}{h^2} = \lim_{h \to 0} \frac{0}{h^2} = 0.
\end{align}$$

== Quadratic approximation ==
Just as the first derivative is related to linear approximations, the second derivative is related to the best quadratic approximation for a function f. This is the quadratic function whose first and second derivatives are the same as those of f at a given point. The formula for the best quadratic approximation to a function f around the point x = a is
$$f(x) \approx f(a) + f'(a)(x-a) + \tfrac{1}{2} f''(a)(x-a)^2.$$
This quadratic approximation is the second-order Taylor polynomial for the function centered at x = a.

== Eigenvalues and eigenvectors of the second derivative ==
For many combinations of boundary conditions explicit formulas for eigenvalues and eigenvectors of the second derivative can be obtained. For example, assuming $x \in [0,L]$ and homogeneous Dirichlet boundary conditions (i.e., $v(0) = v(L) = 0$ where v is the eigenvector), the eigenvalues are $\lambda_j = -\tfrac{j^2 \pi^2}{L^2}$ and the corresponding eigenvectors (also called eigenfunctions) are $v_j(x) = \sqrt{\tfrac{2}{L}} \sin\left(\tfrac{j \pi x}{L}\right)$. Here, $v''_j(x) = \lambda_j v_j(x)$, for $j = 1,\ldots,\infty$.

For other well-known cases, see Eigenvalues and eigenvectors of the second derivative.

== Generalization to higher dimensions ==
=== The Hessian ===
The second derivative generalizes to higher dimensions through the notion of second partial derivatives. For a function f: R^{3} → R, these include the three second-order partials
$$\frac{\partial^2 f}{\partial x^2}, \; \frac{\partial^2 f}{\partial y^2}, \text{ and }\frac{\partial^2 f}{\partial z^2}$$
and the mixed partials
$$\frac{\partial^2 f}{\partial x \, \partial y}, \; \frac{\partial^2 f}{\partial x \, \partial z}, \text{ and } \frac{\partial^2 f}{\partial y \, \partial z}.$$

If the function's image and domain both have a potential, then these fit together into a symmetric matrix known as the Hessian. The eigenvalues of this matrix can be used to implement a multivariable analogue of the second derivative test. (See also the second partial derivative test.)

=== The Laplacian ===
Another common generalization of the second derivative is the Laplacian. This is the differential operator $\nabla^2$ (or $\Delta$) defined by
$$\nabla^2 f = \frac{\partial^2 f}{\partial x^2} + \frac{\partial^2 f}{\partial y^2} + \frac{\partial^2 f}{\partial z^2}.$$
The Laplacian of a function is equal to the divergence of the gradient, and the trace of the Hessian matrix.

== See also ==
- Chirpyness, second derivative of instantaneous phase
- Finite difference, used to approximate second derivative
- Second partial derivative test
- Symmetry of second derivatives
