= Critical point (mathematics) =

Point where the derivative of a function is zero or undefined (in certain cases)

The x-coordinates of the red circles are stationary points; the blue squares are inflection points.

In mathematics, a critical point is the argument of a function where the function derivative is zero (or undefined, as specified below). The value of the function at a critical point is a critical value.

More specifically, when dealing with functions of a real variable, a critical point is a point in the domain of the function where the function derivative is equal to zero (also known as a stationary point) or where the function is not differentiable. Similarly, when dealing with complex variables, a critical point is a point in the function's domain where its derivative is equal to zero (or the function is not holomorphic). Likewise, for a function of several real variables, a critical point is a value in its domain where the gradient norm is equal to zero (or undefined).

This sort of definition extends to differentiable maps between $\R^m$ and $\R^n,$ a critical point being, in this case, a point where the rank of the Jacobian matrix is not maximal. It extends further to differentiable maps between differentiable manifolds, as the points where the rank of the Jacobian matrix decreases. In this case, critical points are also called bifurcation points. In particular, if C is a plane curve, defined by an implicit equation f (x,y) = 0, the critical points of the projection onto the x-axis, parallel to the y-axis are the points where the tangent to C are parallel to the y-axis, that is the points where $\frac{\partial f}{\partial y}(x,y)=0$. In other words, the critical points are those where the implicit function theorem does not apply.

== Critical point of a single variable function ==
A critical point of a function of a single real variable, f (x), is a value x_{0} in the domain of f where f is not differentiable or its derivative is 0 (i.e. $f'(x_0) = 0$). A critical value is the image under f of a critical point. These concepts may be visualized through the graph of f: at a critical point, the graph has a horizontal tangent if one can be assigned at all.

Notice how, for a differentiable function, critical point is the same as stationary point.

Although it is easily visualized on the graph (which is a curve), the notion of critical point of a function must not be confused with the notion of critical point, in some direction, of a curve (see below for a detailed definition). If g(x, y) is a differentiable function of two variables, then g(x,y) = 0 is the implicit equation of a curve. A critical point of such a curve, for the projection parallel to the y-axis (the map (x, y) → x), is a point of the curve where $\tfrac {\partial g}{\partial y}(x,y)=0.$ This means that the tangent of the curve is parallel to the y-axis, and that, at this point, g does not define an implicit function from x to y (see implicit function theorem). If (x_{0}, y_{0}) is such a critical point, then x_{0} is the corresponding critical value. Such a critical point is also called a bifurcation point, as, generally, when x varies, there are two branches of the curve on a side of x_{0} and zero on the other side.

It follows from these definitions that a differentiable function f (x) has a critical point x_{0} with critical value y_{0}, if and only if (x_{0}, y_{0}) is a critical point of its graph for the projection parallel to the x-axis, with the same critical value y_{0}. If f is not differentiable at x_{0} due to the tangent becoming parallel to the y-axis, then x_{0} is again a critical point of f, but now (x_{0}, y_{0}) is a critical point of its graph for the projection parallel to the y-axis.

For example, the critical points of the unit circle of equation $x^2 + y^2 - 1 = 0$ are (0, 1) and (0, -1) for the projection parallel to the x-axis, and (1, 0) and (-1, 0) for the direction parallel to the y-axis. If one considers the upper half circle as the graph of the function $f(x)= \sqrt{1-x^2}$, then x = 0 is a critical point with critical value 1 due to the derivative being equal to 0, and x = ±1 are critical points with critical value 0 due to the derivative being undefined.

=== Examples ===
- The function $f(x) = x^2 + 2x + 3$ is differentiable everywhere, with the derivative $f'(x)=2x+2.$ This function has a unique critical point −1, because it is the unique number x_{0} for which $2x+2=0.$ This point is a global minimum of f. The corresponding critical value is $f(-1) = 2.$ The graph of f is a concave up parabola, the critical point is the abscissa of the vertex, where the tangent line is horizontal, and the critical value is the ordinate of the vertex and may be represented by the intersection of this tangent line and the y-axis.
- The function $f(x) = x^{2/3}$ is defined for all x and differentiable for x ≠ 0, with the derivative $f'(x) = \tfrac{2x^{-1/3}}{3}$. Since f is not differentiable at x = 0 and $f'(x)\neq 0$ otherwise, it is the unique critical point. The graph of the function f has a cusp at this point with vertical tangent. The corresponding critical value is $f(0)=0.$
- The absolute value function $f(x) = |x|$ is differentiable everywhere except at critical point x = 0, where it has a global minimum point, with critical value 0.
- The function $f(x) = \tfrac{1}{x}$ has no critical points. The point x = 0 is not a critical point because it is not included in the function's domain.

=== Location of critical points ===
By the Gauss–Lucas theorem, all of a polynomial function's critical points in the complex plane are within the convex hull of the roots of the function. Thus for a polynomial function with only real roots, all critical points are real and are between the greatest and smallest roots.

Sendov's conjecture asserts that, if all of a function's roots lie in the unit disk in the complex plane, then there is at least one critical point within unit distance of any given root.

== Critical points of an implicit curve ==
Critical points play an important role in the study of plane curves defined by implicit equations, in particular for sketching them and determining their topology. The notion of critical point that is used in this section, may seem different from that of previous section. In fact it is the specialization to a simple case of the general notion of critical point given below.

Thus, we consider a curve C defined by an implicit equation $f(x,y)=0$, where f is a differentiable function of two variables, commonly a bivariate polynomial. The points of the curve are the points of the Euclidean plane whose Cartesian coordinates satisfy the equation. There are two standard projections $\pi_y$ and $\pi_x$, defined by $\pi_y ((x,y))=x$ and $\pi_x ((x,y))=y,$ that map the curve onto the coordinate axes. They are called the projection parallel to the y-axis and the projection parallel to the x-axis, respectively.

A point of C is critical for $\pi_y$, if the tangent to C exists and is parallel to the y-axis. In that case, the images by $\pi_y$ of the critical point and of the tangent are the same point of the x-axis, called the critical value. Thus a point of C is critical for $\pi_y$ if its coordinates are a solution of the system of equations:

$$f(x,y)=\frac{\partial f}{\partial y}(x,y)=0$$

This implies that this definition is a special case of the general definition of a critical point, which is given below.

The definition of a critical point for $\pi_x$ is similar. If C is the graph of a function $y=g(x)$, then (x, y) is critical for $\pi_x$ if and only if x is a critical point of g, and that the critical values are the same.

Some authors define the critical points of C as the points that are critical for either $\pi_x$ or $\pi_y$, although they depend not only on C, but also on the choice of the coordinate axes. It depends also on the authors if the singular points are considered as critical points. In fact the singular points are the points that satisfy
$$f(x,y)=\frac{\partial f}{\partial x}(x,y)=\frac{\partial f}{\partial y}(x,y)=0,$$
and are thus solutions of either system of equations characterizing the critical points. With this more general definition, the critical points for $\pi_y$ are exactly the points where the implicit function theorem does not apply.

=== Use of the discriminant ===
When the curve C is algebraic, that is when it is defined by a bivariate polynomial f, then the discriminant is a useful tool to compute the critical points.

Here we consider only the projection $\pi_y$; Similar results apply to $\pi_x$ by exchanging x and y.

Let $\operatorname{Disc}_y(f)$ be the discriminant of f viewed as a polynomial in y with coefficients that are polynomials in x. This discriminant is thus a polynomial in x which has the critical values of $\pi_y$ among its roots.

More precisely, a simple root of $\operatorname{Disc}_y(f)$ is either a critical value of $\pi_y$ such the corresponding critical point is a point which is not singular nor an inflection point, or the x-coordinate of an asymptote which is parallel to the y-axis and is tangent "at infinity" to an inflection point (inflexion asymptote).

A multiple root of the discriminant correspond either to several critical points or inflection asymptotes sharing the same critical value, or to a critical point which is also an inflection point, or to a singular point.

== Several variables ==
For a function of several real variables, a point P (that is a set of values for the input variables, which is viewed as a point in $\R^n$) is critical if it is a point where the gradient is zero or undefined. The critical values are the values of the function at the critical points.

A critical point (where the function is differentiable) may be either a local maximum, a local minimum or a saddle point. If the function is at least twice continuously differentiable the different cases may be distinguished by considering the eigenvalues of the Hessian matrix of second derivatives.

A critical point at which the Hessian matrix is nonsingular is said to be nondegenerate, and the signs of the eigenvalues of the Hessian determine the local behavior of the function. In the case of a function of a single variable, the Hessian is simply the second derivative, viewed as a 1×1-matrix, which is nonsingular if and only if it is not zero. In this case, a non-degenerate critical point is a local maximum or a local minimum, depending on the sign of the second derivative, which is positive for a local minimum and negative for a local maximum. If the second derivative is null, the critical point is generally an inflection point, but may also be an undulation point, which may be a local minimum or a local maximum.

For a function of n variables, the number of negative eigenvalues of the Hessian matrix at a critical point is called the index of the critical point. A non-degenerate critical point is a local maximum if and only if the index is n, or, equivalently, if the Hessian matrix is negative definite; it is a local minimum if the index is zero, or, equivalently, if the Hessian matrix is positive definite. For the other values of the index, a non-degenerate critical point is a saddle point, that is a point which is a maximum in some directions and a minimum in others.

=== Application to optimization ===
By Fermat's theorem, all local maxima and minima of a continuous function occur at critical points. Therefore, to find the local maxima and minima of a differentiable function, it suffices, theoretically, to compute the zeros of the gradient and the eigenvalues of the Hessian matrix at these zeros. This requires the solution of a system of equations, which can be a difficult task. The usual numerical algorithms are much more efficient for finding local extrema, but cannot certify that all extrema have been found. In particular, in global optimization, these methods cannot certify that the output is really the global optimum.

When the function to minimize is a multivariate polynomial, the critical points and the critical values are solutions of a system of polynomial equations, and modern algorithms for solving such systems provide competitive certified methods for finding the global minimum.

== Critical point of a differentiable map ==
Given a differentiable map $f: \R^m \to \R^n,$ the critical points of f are the points of $\R^m,$ where the rank of the Jacobian matrix of f is not maximal. The image of a critical point under f is called a critical value. A point in the complement of the set of critical values is called a regular value. Sard's theorem states that the set of critical values of a smooth map has measure zero.

Some authors give a slightly different definition: a critical point of f is a point of $\R^m$ where the rank of the Jacobian matrix of f is less than n. With this convention, all points are critical when m < n.

These definitions extend to differential maps between differentiable manifolds in the following way. Let $f:V \to W$ be a differential map between two manifolds V and W of respective dimensions m and n. In the neighborhood of a point p of V and of f (p), charts are diffeomorphisms $\varphi : V \to \R^m$ and $\psi : W \to \R^n.$ The point p is critical for f if $\varphi(p)$ is critical for $\psi \circ f \circ \varphi^{-1}.$ This definition does not depend on the choice of the charts because the transitions maps being diffeomorphisms, their Jacobian matrices are invertible and multiplying by them does not modify the rank of the Jacobian matrix of $\psi \circ f \circ \varphi^{-1}.$ If M is a Hilbert manifold (not necessarily finite dimensional) and f is a real-valued function then we say that p is a critical point of f if f is not a submersion at p.

== Application to topology ==
Critical points are fundamental for studying the topology of manifolds and real algebraic varieties. In particular, they are the basic tool for Morse theory and catastrophe theory.

The link between critical points and topology already appears at a lower level of abstraction. For example, let $V$ be a sub-manifold of $\mathbb R^n,$ and P be a point outside $V.$ The square of the distance to P of a point of $V$ is a differential map such that each connected component of $V$ contains at least a critical point, where the distance is minimal. It follows that the number of connected components of $V$ is bounded above by the number of critical points.

In the case of real algebraic varieties, this observation associated with Bézout's theorem allows us to bound the number of connected components by a function of the degrees of the polynomials that define the variety.

== See also ==
- Singular point of a curve
- Singularity theory
- Nullcline
