= Gregory Chow =

Chinese-American economist

- Born: December 25, 1930 (age 95); Guangdong, China
- Education: Lingnan University; Cornell University (BA); University of Chicago (MA, PhD)
- Known for: Econometrics, Dynamical economics, Chinese economy
- Scientific career
- Fields: Economics, econometrics
- Workplaces: Xiamen University; Princeton 1970–present Rutgers 1969; Harvard 1967; Columbia 1965–1971; Thomas J. Watson 1962–1970; MIT 1955–1959; Cornell 1952–1962,1964
- Doctoral advisor: Arnold Harberger

Gregory Chi-Chong Chow (simplified Chinese: 邹至庄; traditional Chinese: 鄒至莊; pinyin: Zōu Zhìzhuāng; born December 25, 1930) is a Chinese-American economist at Princeton University and Xiamen University. The Chow test, commonly used in econometrics to test for structural breaks, was invented by him. He has also been influential in the economic policy of China, including being an adviser for the Economic Planning and Development Council of the Executive Yuan in the Republic of China, and being an adviser for the Chinese State Commission for Restructuring the Economic System on economic reform.

== Life ==
Chow grew up in Guangzhou in Guangdong province in South China, one of seven children in a wealthy family, and in Hong Kong, where the family fled after the 1937 Japanese invasion of China. The family moved to Macao after the 1942 Japanese invasion of Hong Kong, then back to Guangzhou at the end of World War II.

Chow spent one year at Lingnan University in Guangzhou, then finished his undergraduate work at Cornell University. He entered graduate study in economics at the University of Chicago in 1951. He did his 1955 dissertation there on the factors that determine the demand for automobiles, and in extending that work he developed the Chow test for determining the stability of regression coefficients across different data samples.

He subsequently was on the faculties of MIT and then Cornell. He then worked at the IBM Thomas Watson Research Center while also advising the government of Taiwan. In 1970 he joined the faculty at Princeton University, until his retirement in 2001. He was named fellow to the Econometric Society in 1967. In 1974 he was elected as a Fellow of the American Statistical Association. He also served as the chairman of the American Economic Association's Committee on Exchanges in Economics with the People's Republic of China between the years of 1981 and 1985. He was elected to the American Philosophical Society in 1992.

Chow's wife Paula K. Chow is the co-founder and director of the International Center at Princeton. The couple have two sons who are engineers and a daughter who is a radiologist.

== Contributions ==
In addition to being the creator of the Chow test, Chow has done research on linear and nonlinear simultaneous equation systems, full-information maximum likelihood estimation, estimation with missing observations, estimation of large-scale macroeconometric models, and modeling and forecasting with time series methods. He made major contributions to optimal control theory and its application to stochastic economic systems. His doctoral dissertation at the University of Chicago studied empirical factors of demand within the automotive industry.

Chow has written extensively on the economies of Taiwan, Hong Kong, and China, and has served as an advisor to those regions.

Chow has also made important contributions in China's economics education. While every econometrics student learns the “Chow test”, Chow is actually more famous in China for another Chow test—an elaborate testing system designed by him in the mid-1980s to select top Chinese college students from all over China and bring them to the US to pursue graduate studies in economics. Today, over a hundred "Chow fellows" are active in the economics field, many have returned to China, and become accomplished academics, top policy makers, and prominent business leaders.

== Selected publications ==
- Analysis and Control of Dynamic Economic Systems New York: John Wiley, 1975. Econometrics New York: McGraw-Hill, 1983.
- The Chinese Economy New York: Harper and Row, 1985; second ed., Singapore: World Scientific, 1987.
- Dynamic Economics: Optimization by the Lagrange Method New York: Oxford University Press, 1997.
- China's Economic Transformation. John Wiley & Sons. 16 March 2015 [2002]. ISBN 978-1-118-90995-9.
- Knowing China Singapore: World Scientific, 2004.
- Interpreting China's Economy Singapore: World Scientific, 2010.
- Chow, Gregory C. (2014). China's Economic and Social Problems. World Scientific. doi:10.1142/9107. ISBN 978-981-4590-40-2.
- Chow, Gregory C. (2015). Economic Analysis of Environmental Problems. World Scientific. doi:10.1142/8397. ISBN 978-981-4397-51-3.
