= Weight space =

In mathematics, weight space may refer to:

- Weight space (representation theory)
- Parameter space in artificial neural networks, where the parameters are weights on graph edges.
