= Structural break =

Econometric term

Linear regression with a structural break

In econometrics and statistics, a structural break is an unexpected change over time in the parameters of regression models, which can lead to huge forecasting errors and unreliability of the model in general. This issue was popularised by David Hendry, who argued that lack of stability of coefficients frequently caused forecast failure, and therefore we must routinely test for structural stability. Structural stability − i.e., the time-invariance of regression coefficients − is a central issue in all applications of linear regression models.

== Structural break tests ==
=== A single break in mean with a known breakpoint ===
For linear regression models, the Chow test is often used to test for a single break in mean at a known time period K for K ∈ [1,T]. This test assesses whether the coefficients in a regression model are the same for periods [1,2, ...,K] and [K + 1, ...,T].

=== Other forms of structural breaks ===
Other challenges occur where there are:

Case 1: a known number of breaks in mean with unknown break points;
Case 2: an unknown number of breaks in mean with unknown break points;
Case 3: breaks in variance.

The Chow test is not applicable in these situations, since it only applies to models with a known breakpoint and where the error variance remains constant before and after the break. Bayesian methods exist to address these difficult cases via Markov chain Monte Carlo inference.

In general, the CUSUM (cumulative sum) and CUSUM-sq (CUSUM squared) tests can be used to test the constancy of the coefficients in a model. The bounds test can also be used. For cases 1 and 2, the sup-Wald (i.e., the supremum of a set of Wald statistics), sup-LM (i.e., the supremum of a set of Lagrange multiplier statistics), and sup-LR (i.e., the supremum of a set of likelihood ratio statistics) tests developed by Andrews (1993, 2003) may be used to test for parameter instability when the number and location of structural breaks are unknown. These tests were shown to be superior to the CUSUM test in terms of statistical power, and are the most commonly used tests for the detection of structural change involving an unknown number of breaks in mean with unknown break points. The sup-Wald, sup-LM, and sup-LR tests are asymptotic in general (i.e., the asymptotic critical values for these tests are applicable for sample size n as n → ∞), and involve the assumption of homoskedasticity across break points for finite samples; however, an exact test with the sup-Wald statistic may be obtained for a linear regression model with a fixed number of regressors and independent and identically distributed (IID) normal errors. A method developed by Bai and Perron (2003) also allows for the detection of multiple structural breaks from data.

The MZ test developed by Maasoumi, Zaman, and Ahmed (2010) allows for the simultaneous detection of one or more breaks in both mean and variance at a known break point. The sup-MZ test developed by Ahmed, Haider, and Zaman (2016) is a generalization of the MZ test which allows for the detection of breaks in mean and variance at an unknown break point.

=== Structural breaks in cointegration models ===
For a cointegration model, the Gregory–Hansen test (1996) can be used for one unknown structural break, the Hatemi–J test (2006) can be used for two unknown breaks and the Maki (2012) test allows for multiple structural breaks.

== Statistical packages ==
There are many statistical packages that can be used to find structural breaks, including R, GAUSS, and Stata, among others. For example, a list of R packages for time series data is summarized at the changepoint detection section of the Time Series Analysis Task View, including both classical and Bayesian methods.

== See also ==
- Structural change
- Change detection
- Great Moderation
