= Fisher consistency =

In statistics, Fisher consistency, named after Ronald Fisher, is a desirable property of an estimator asserting that if the estimator were calculated using the entire population rather than a sample, the true value of the estimated parameter would be obtained.

== Definition ==
Suppose we have a statistical sample X_{1}, ..., X_{n} where each X_{i} follows a cumulative distribution F_{θ} which depends on an unknown parameter θ. If an estimator of θ based on the sample can be represented as a functional of the empirical distribution function F̂_{n}:

$$\hat{ \theta } =T(\hat F_n) \,,$$

the estimator is said to be Fisher consistent if:

$T(F_\theta) = \theta \, .$

As long as the X_{i} are exchangeable, an estimator T defined in terms of the X_{i} can be converted into an estimator T′ that can be defined in terms of F̂_{n} by averaging T over all permutations of the data. The resulting estimator will have the same expected value as T and its variance will be no larger than that of T.

If the strong law of large numbers can be applied, the empirical distribution functions F̂_{n} converge pointwise to F_{θ}, allowing us to express Fisher consistency as a limit — the estimator is Fisher consistent if

$$T \left( \lim_{n\rightarrow\infty} \hat F_n \right) = \theta. \,$$

== Finite population example ==
Suppose our sample is obtained from a finite population Z_{1}, ..., Z_{m}. We can represent our sample of size n in terms of the proportion of the sample n_{i} / n taking on each value in the population. Writing our estimator of θ as T(n_{1} / n, ..., n_{m} / n), the population analogue of the estimator is T(p_{1}, ..., p_{m}), where p_{i} = P(X = Z_{i}). Thus we have Fisher consistency if T(p_{1}, ..., p_{m}) = θ.

Suppose the parameter of interest is the expected value μ and the estimator is the sample mean, which can be written

$$n^{-1}\sum_{i=1}^n\sum_{j=1}^mI(X_i=Z_j)Z_j,$$

where I is the indicator function. The population analogue of this expression is

$$n^{-1}\sum_{i=1}^n\sum_{j=1}^mp_jZ_j = n^{-1}\sum_{i=1}^n\mu = \mu,$$

so we have Fisher consistency.

== Role in maximum likelihood estimation ==
Maximising the likelihood function L gives an estimate that is Fisher consistent for a parameter b if

$$E\left[ \frac{d\ln L}{db} \right] = 0\text{ at }b=b_0, \,$$

where b_{0} represents the true value of b.

== Relationship to asymptotic consistency and unbiasedness ==
The term consistency in statistics usually refers to an estimator that is asymptotically consistent. Fisher consistency and asymptotic consistency are distinct concepts, although both aim to define a desirable property of an estimator. While many estimators are consistent in both senses, neither definition encompasses the other. For example, suppose we take an estimator T_{n} that is both Fisher consistent and asymptotically consistent, and then form T_{n} + E_{n}, where E_{n} is a deterministic sequence of nonzero numbers converging to zero. This estimator is asymptotically consistent, but not Fisher consistent for any n.

The sample mean is a Fisher consistent and unbiased estimate of the population mean, but not all Fisher consistent estimates are unbiased. Suppose we observe a sample from a uniform distribution on (0,θ) and we wish to estimate θ. The sample maximum is Fisher consistent, but downwardly biased. Conversely, the sample variance is an unbiased estimate of the population variance, but is not Fisher consistent.

== Role in decision theory ==
A loss function is Fisher consistent if the population minimizer of the risk leads to the Bayes optimal decision rule.
