= Structural change =

Fundamental shifts in systems

In economics, structural change is a shift or change in the basic ways a market or economy functions or operates.

Such change can be caused by such factors as economic development, global shifts in capital and labor, changes in resource availability due to war or natural disaster or discovery or depletion of natural resources, or a change in political system. For example, a subsistence economy may be transformed into a manufacturing economy, or a regulated mixed economy may be liberalized. A current driver of structural change in the world economy is globalization. Structural change is possible because of the dynamic nature of the economic system.

Patterns and changes in sectoral employment drive demand shifts through the income elasticity. Shifting demand for both locally sourced goods and for imported products is a fundamental part of development. The structural changes that move countries through the development process are often viewed in terms of shifts from primary, to secondary and finally, to tertiary production. Technical progress is seen as crucial in the process of structural change as it involves the obsolescence of skills, vocations, and permanent changes in spending and production resulting in structural unemployment.

== Examples ==
Historically, structural change has not always been strictly for the better. The division of Korea and the separate paths of development taken by each state exemplifies this. Korea under Japanese rule was relatively uniform in economic structure, but after World War II, the two countries underwent drastically different structural changes due to drastically different political structures.

South Korea's economy before the 1950s mostly consisted of agriculture. During the 1960s and 1970s, Korea began to change their structure to IT, micro systems technology, and also services. More than 50% of the world uses a Samsung smartphone, whose headquarters are located there. Today, South Korea's economy is the 15th strongest economy system.

In the Ruhr Area (Ruhrgebiet) in Germany, the economy was mostly marked by coal and steel industry. During and after the coal crisis began in the 1960s and 1970s, this area started to change its economic structures to services, IT and logistics. The city Dortmund opened the first technology center named "Technologiepark Dortmund" in the 1980s. Companies including Signal Iduna and Wilo are based there.

Structural change can be initiated by policy decisions or permanent changes in resources, population or the society. The downfall of communism, for example, is a political change that has had far-reaching economic implications.

== Structural changes in employment ==
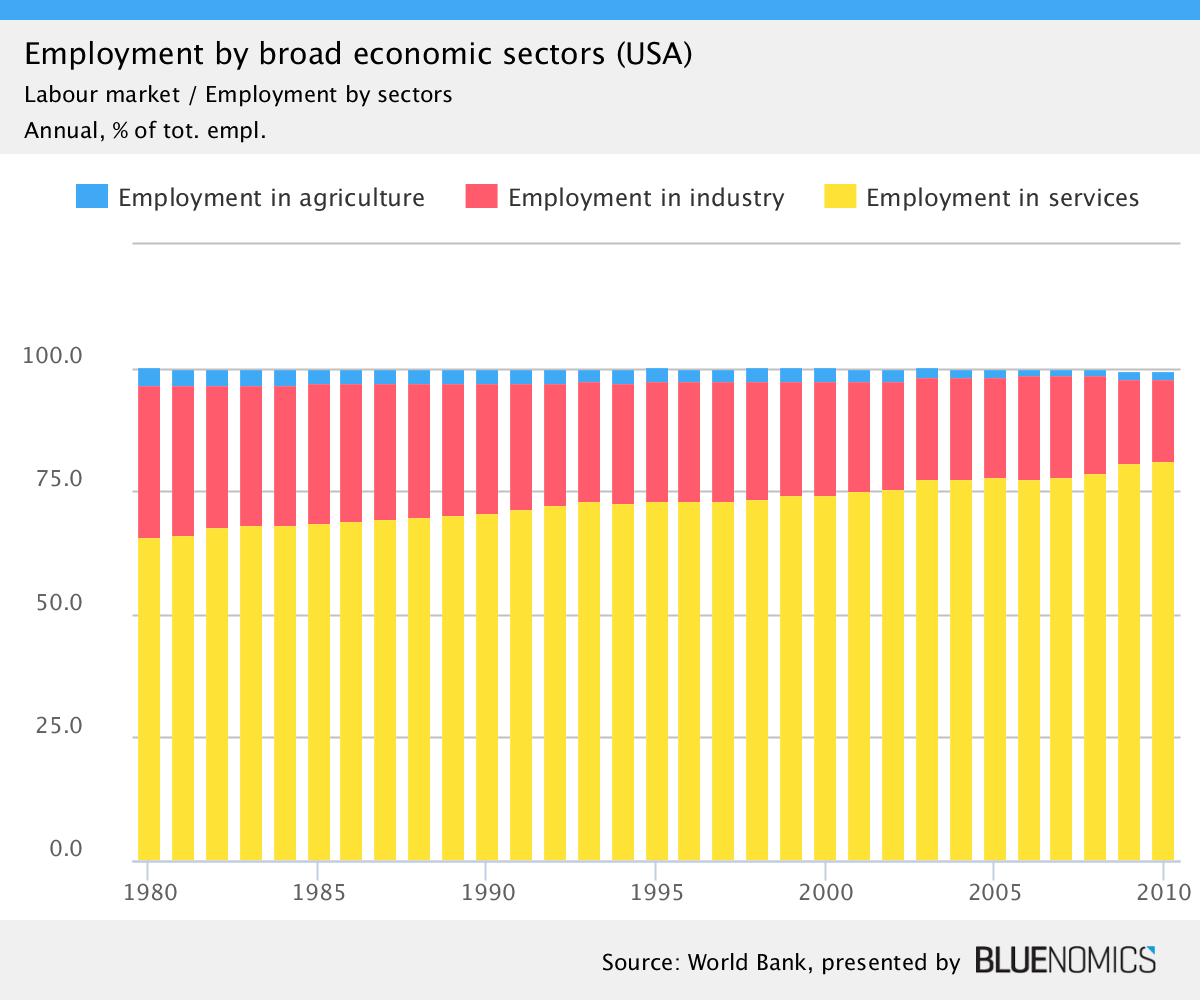
US employment by sectors, both genders

Economic structural changes impact also on employment. A developing economy typically reveals a high share of employment in the primary sector, while the share of employment in the tertiary sector is high in an advanced/developed economy.

== Testing econometric models for structural change ==
Structural change tests are a type of econometric hypothesis test. They are used to verify the equality of coefficients across separate subsamples of a data set.

== See also ==
- Chow test
- Structural fix
