= Consistent estimator =

Statistical estimator

{T_{1}, T_{2}, T_{3}, ...} is a sequence of estimators for parameter θ_{0}, the true value of which is 4. This sequence is consistent: the estimators are getting more and more concentrated near the true value θ_{0}; at the same time, these estimators are biased. The limiting distribution of the sequence is a degenerate random variable which equals θ_{0} with probability 1.

In statistics, a consistent estimator or asymptotically consistent estimator is an estimator—a rule for computing estimates of a parameter θ_{0}—having the property that as the number of data points used increases indefinitely, the resulting sequence of estimates converges in probability to θ_{0}. This means that the distributions of the estimates become more and more concentrated near the true value of the parameter being estimated, so that the probability of the estimator being arbitrarily close to θ_{0} converges to one.

In practice one constructs an estimator as a function of an available sample of size n, and then imagines being able to keep collecting data and expanding the sample ad infinitum. In this way one would obtain a sequence of estimates indexed by n, and consistency is a property of what occurs as the sample size “grows to infinity”. If the sequence of estimates can be mathematically shown to converge in probability to the true value θ_{0}, it is called a consistent estimator; otherwise the estimator is said to be inconsistent.

Consistency as defined here is sometimes referred to as weak consistency. When we replace convergence in probability with almost sure convergence, then the estimator is said to be strongly consistent. Consistency is related to bias; see bias versus consistency.

== Definition ==
Formally speaking, an estimator T_{n} of parameter θ is said to be weakly consistent, if it converges in probability to the true value of the parameter:

$$\underset{n\to\infty}{\operatorname{plim}}\;T_n = \theta.$$

i.e. if, for all ε > 0

$$\lim_{n\to\infty}\Pr\big(|T_n-\theta| > \varepsilon\big) = 0.$$

An estimator T_{n} of parameter θ is said to be strongly consistent, if it converges almost surely to the true value of the parameter:

$$\Pr\big(\lim_{n\to\infty}T_n = \theta\big) = 1.$$

A more rigorous definition takes into account the fact that θ is actually unknown, and thus, the convergence in probability must take place for every possible value of this parameter. Suppose {p_{θ}: θ ∈ Θ} is a family of distributions (the parametric model), and X^{θ} = {X_{1}, X_{2}, … : X_{i} ~ p_{θ}} is an infinite sample from the distribution p_{θ}. Let { T_{n}(X^{θ}) } be a sequence of estimators for some parameter g(θ). Usually, T_{n} will be based on the first n observations of a sample. Then this sequence {T_{n}} is said to be (weakly) consistent if

$$\underset{n\to\infty}{\operatorname{plim}}\;T_n(X^{\theta}) = g(\theta),\ \ \text{for all}\ \theta\in\Theta.$$

This definition uses g(θ) instead of simply θ, because often one is interested in estimating a certain function or a sub-vector of the underlying parameter. In the next example, we estimate the location parameter of the model, but not the scale:

== Examples ==
=== Sample mean of a normal random variable ===
Suppose one has a sequence of statistically independent observations {X_{1}, X_{2}, ...} from a normal N(μ, σ^{2}) distribution. To estimate μ based on the first n observations, one can use the sample mean: T_{n} = (X_{1} + ... + X_{n})/n. This defines a sequence of estimators, indexed by the sample size n.

From the properties of the normal distribution, we know the sampling distribution of this statistic: T_{n} is itself normally distributed, with mean μ and variance σ^{2}/n. Equivalently, $\scriptstyle (T_n-\mu)/(\sigma/\sqrt{n})$ has a standard normal distribution:

$$\Pr\!\left[\,|T_n-\mu|\geq\varepsilon\,\right] =
\Pr\!\left[ \frac{\sqrt{n}\,\big|T_n-\mu\big|}{\sigma} \geq \sqrt{n}\varepsilon/\sigma \right] =
2\left(1-\Phi\left(\frac{\sqrt{n}\,\varepsilon}{\sigma}\right)\right) \to 0$$

as n tends to infinity, for any fixed ε > 0. Therefore, the sequence T_{n} of sample means is consistent for the population mean μ (recalling that $\Phi$ is the cumulative distribution of the standard normal distribution).

== Establishing consistency ==
The notion of asymptotic consistency is very close, almost synonymous to the notion of convergence in probability. As such, any theorem, lemma, or property which establishes convergence in probability may be used to prove the consistency. Many such tools exist:

- In order to demonstrate consistency directly from the definition one can use the inequality

$$\Pr\!\big[h(T_n-\theta)\geq\varepsilon\big] \leq \frac{\operatorname{E}\big[h(T_n-\theta)\big]}{h(\varepsilon)},$$

the most common choice for function h being either the absolute value (in which case it is known as Markov inequality), or the quadratic function (respectively Chebyshev's inequality).

- Another useful result is the continuous mapping theorem: if T_{n} is consistent for θ and g(·) is a real-valued function continuous at the point θ, then g(T_{n}) will be consistent for g(θ):

$$T_n\ \xrightarrow{p}\ \theta\ \quad\Rightarrow\quad g(T_n)\ \xrightarrow{p}\ g(\theta)$$

- Slutsky's theorem can be used to combine several different estimators, or an estimator with a non-random convergent sequence. If T_{n} →^{d}α, and S_{n} →^{p}β, then

$$\begin{align}
& T_n + S_n \ \xrightarrow{d}\ \alpha+\beta, \\
& T_n   S_n \ \xrightarrow{d}\ \alpha \beta, \\
& T_n / S_n \ \xrightarrow{d}\ \alpha/\beta, \text{ provided that }\beta\neq0
\end{align}$$

- If estimator T_{n} is given by an explicit formula, then most likely the formula will employ sums of random variables, and then the law of large numbers can be used: for a sequence {X_{n}} of random variables and under suitable conditions,

$$\frac{1}{n}\sum_{i=1}^n g(X_i) \ \xrightarrow{p}\ \operatorname{E}[\,g(X)\,]$$

- If estimator T_{n} is defined implicitly, for example as a value that maximizes certain objective function (see extremum estimator), then a more complicated argument involving stochastic equicontinuity has to be used.

== Bias versus consistency ==
=== Unbiased but not consistent ===
An estimator can be unbiased but not consistent. For example, for an iid sample {x_{1},..., x_{n}} one can use T_{n}(X) = x_{n} as the estimator of the mean E[X]. Note that here the sampling distribution of T_{n} is the same as the underlying distribution (for any n, as it ignores all points but the last). So E[T_{n}(X)] = E[X] for any n, hence it is unbiased, but it does not converge to any value.

However, if a sequence of estimators is unbiased and converges to a value, then it is consistent, as it must converge to the correct value.

=== Biased but consistent ===
Alternatively, an estimator can be biased but consistent. For example, if the mean is estimated by ${1 \over n} \sum x_i + {1 \over n}$ it is biased, but as $n \rightarrow \infty$, it approaches the correct value, and so it is consistent.

Important examples include the sample variance and sample standard deviation. Without Bessel's correction (that is, when using the sample size $n$ instead of the degrees of freedom $n-1$), these are both negatively biased but consistent estimators. With the correction, the corrected sample variance is unbiased, while the corrected sample standard deviation is still biased, but less so, and both are still consistent: the correction factor converges to 1 as sample size grows.

Here is another example. Let $T_n$ be a sequence of estimators for $\theta$.

$$\Pr(T_n) = \begin{cases}
1 - 1/n, & \mbox{if }\, T_n = \theta \\
1/n,  & \mbox{if }\, T_n = n\delta + \theta
\end{cases}$$

We can see that $T_n \xrightarrow{p} \theta$, $\operatorname{E}[T_n] = \theta + \delta$, and the bias does not converge to zero.

== See also ==
- Efficient estimator
- Fisher consistency — alternative, although rarely used concept of consistency for the estimators
- Regression dilution
- Statistical hypothesis testing
- Instrumental variables estimation
