= Extremum estimator =

In statistics and econometrics, extremum estimators are a wide class of estimators for parametric models that are calculated through maximization (or minimization) of a certain objective function, which depends on the data. The general theory of extremum estimators was developed by Amemiya (1985).

== Definition ==
An estimator $\scriptstyle\hat\theta$ is called an extremum estimator, if there is an objective function $\scriptstyle\hat{Q}_n$ such that

$$\hat\theta = \underset{\theta\in\Theta}{\operatorname{arg\;max}}\ \widehat{Q}_n(\theta),$$

where Θ is the parameter space. Sometimes a slightly weaker definition is given:

$$\widehat Q_n(\hat\theta) \geq  \max_{\theta\in\Theta}\,\widehat Q_n(\theta) - o_p(1),$$

where o_{p}(1) is the variable converging in probability to zero. With this modification $\scriptstyle\hat\theta$ doesn't have to be the exact maximizer of the objective function, just be sufficiently close to it.

The theory of extremum estimators does not specify what the objective function should be. There are various types of objective functions suitable for different models, and this framework allows us to analyse the theoretical properties of such estimators from a unified perspective. The theory only specifies the properties that the objective function has to possess, and so selecting a particular objective function only requires verifying that those properties are satisfied.

== Consistency ==
When the parameter space Θ is not compact (Θ = R in this example), then even if the objective function is uniquely maximized at θ_{0}, this maximum may be not well-separated, in which case the estimator $\scriptscriptstyle\hat\theta$ will fail to be consistent.

If the parameter space Θ is compact and there is a limiting function Q_{0}(θ) such that: $\scriptstyle\hat{Q}_n(\theta)$ converges to Q_{0}(θ) in probability uniformly over Θ, and the function Q_{0}(θ) is continuous and has a unique maximum at θ = θ_{0} then $\scriptstyle\hat\theta$ is consistent for θ_{0}.

The uniform convergence in probability of $\scriptstyle\hat{Q}_n(\theta)$ means that

$$\sup_{\theta\in\Theta} \big| \hat{Q}_n(\theta) - Q_0(\theta) \big| \ \xrightarrow{p}\ 0.$$

The requirement for Θ to be compact can be replaced with a weaker assumption that the maximum of Q_{0} was well-separated, that is there should not exist any points θ that are distant from θ_{0} but such that Q_{0}(θ) were close to Q_{0}(θ_{0}). Formally, it means that for any sequence {θ_{i}} such that Q_{0}(θ_{i}) → Q_{0}(θ_{0}), it should be true that θ_{i} → θ_{0}.

== Asymptotic normality ==
Assuming that consistency has been established and the derivatives of the sample $Q_{n}$ satisfy some other conditions, the extremum estimator converges to an asymptotically Normal distribution.

== Examples ==
- Maximum likelihood estimation uses the objective function
  $$\hat{Q}_n(\theta) = \log \left[ \prod_{i=1}^{n} f(x_i|\theta) \right] = \sum_{i=1}^{n} \log f(x_i|\theta) ,$$
  where f(·|θ) is the density function of the distribution from where the observations are drawn. This objective function is called the log-likelihood function.
- Generalized method of moments estimator is defined through the objective function
  $$\hat{Q}_n(\theta) = - \Bigg(\frac1n\sum_{i=1}^n g(x_i,\theta)\Bigg)' \hat{W}_n \Bigg(\frac1n\sum_{i=1}^n g(x_i,\theta)\Bigg),$$
  where g(·|θ) is the moment condition of the model.
- Minimum distance estimator
- Least squares estimator

== See also ==
- M-estimators
