= Genotypic and phenotypic repair =

Component of an evolutionary algorithm

Genotypic and phenotypic repair are optional components of an evolutionary algorithm (EA). An EA reproduces essential elements of biological evolution as a computer algorithm in order to solve demanding optimization or planning tasks, at least approximately. A candidate solution is represented by a - usually linear - data structure that plays the role of an individual's chromosome. New solution candidates are generated by mutation and crossover operators following the example of biology. These offspring may be defective, which is corrected or compensated for by genotypic or phenotypic repair.

== Description ==
Genotypic repair, also known as genetic repair, is the removal or correction of impermissible entries in the chromosome that violate restrictions. In phenotypic repair, the corrections are only made in the genotype-phenotype mapping and the chromosome remains unchanged. Michalewicz wrote about the importance of restrictions in real-world applications: "In general, constraints are an integral part of the formulation of any problem".

Restriction violations are application-specific and therefore it depends on the current problem whether and which type of repair is useful. They can usually also be treated by a correspondingly extended evaluation and it depends on the problem which measures are possible and which is the most suitable. If a phenotypic repair is feasible, then it is usually the most efficient compared to the other measures. A survey on repair methods used as constraint handling techniques can be found in.

Violations of the range limits of genes should be avoided as far as possible by the formulation of the genome. If this is not possible or if restrictions within the search space defined by the genome are involved, their violations are usually handled by the evaluation. This can be done, for example, by penalty functions that lower the fitness.

Repair is often also required for combinatorial tasks. The application of a 1- or n-point crossover operator can, for example, lead to genes being missing in one of the child genomes that are present in duplicate in the other. In this case, a suitable genotypic repair measure is to move the surplus genes to the other genome in a positional manner. The use of the aforementioned operators in combinatorial tasks has also proven to be useful in combination with crossover types specially developed for permutations, at least for certain problems.

Particularly in combinatorial problems, it has been observed that genotypic repair can promote premature convergence to a suboptimum, but can also significantly accelerate a successful search. Studies on various tasks have shown that this is application-dependent. An effective measure to avoid premature convergence is generally the use of structured populations instead of the usual panmictic ones.

Sequence restrictions play a role in many scheduling tasks, for example when it comes to planning workflows. If, for example, it is specified that step A must be carried out before step B and the gene of step B is located before the gene of A in the chromosome, then there is an impermissible gene sequence. This is because the scheduling operation of step B requires the planned end of step A for correct scheduling, but this is not yet scheduled at the time gene B is processed. The problem can be solved in two ways:

1. The scheduling operation of step B is postponed until the gene from step A has been processed. The genome remains unchanged and the repair only influences the genotype-phenotype mapping. Since only the phenotype is changed, this is referred to as phenotypic repair.
2. If, on the other hand, the gene of step B is moved behind the gene of step A, this is a genotypic repair. The same applies to the alternative shift of gene A in front of gene B.

In this case, genotypic repair has the disadvantage that it prevents a meaningful restructuring of the gene sequence in the chromosome if this requires several intermediate steps (mutations) that at least partially violate restrictions.
