= Essynth =

Mathematical model for sound synthesis

Essynth is a mathematical model for interactive sound synthesis based on the evolutionary computation which uses genetic operators and fitness functions to create sound. In Essynth, digitally sampled sounds (waveforms) are represented as individuals within a population set that describes an evolutionary path over time in generation steps. Here the evolution is given by the population's adaptation to another set of individuals, called here as the Target Set, which conveys all psychoacoustic features that steers the population evolution. This process is somehow similar to the “evolution pressure” that dictates the adaptation of populations in biological systems. The “best individual” within the population is the one most similar to the Target set. Unlike others deterministic sound synthesis methods such as the linear methods (i.e. additive synthesis), the non-linear (i.e. frequency modulation synthesis) and the sample-based methods (i.e. sample-based synthesis) Essynth is a non-deterministic method of sound synthesis once that its resulting sound is not fixed for the same parametric values but continuously evolves over time.

In Essynth, the group of individual's psychoacoustic features is called genotype. There are three basic models to represent the genotype in Essynth. They are: 1) digitally sampled sound segments (waveforms), 2) psychoacoustic curves of loudness, pitch and spectrum, and 3) 3D spectrogram.

The synthesized sound produced by this method is given by two processes, here called as: Reproduction and Selection. Reproduction uses the genetic operators: crossover and mutation to create new individuals by transforming its predecessor's genotype and Selection uses Hausdorff distance as the fitness evaluation methodology to select the best individuals, as well as eliminating the ones too distant from the Target set.

Since Essynth is a non-deterministic method, in addition to the convergence to the Target set, Essynth also produces a rich sound environment resulting from its dynamical behavior in time. As in nature, the evolutionary steps never repeat itself, although it may present some strong resemblance or similarity among individuals within the population.
