= Evolutionary programming =

Evolutionary algorithm with a defined structure

Evolutionary programming is an evolutionary algorithm, where a share of the new population is created by mutating the previous population without crossover. Evolutionary programming differs from evolution strategy ES($\mu+\lambda$) in one detail. All individuals are selected for the new population, while in ES($\mu+\lambda$), every individual has the same probability to be selected. It is one of the four major evolutionary algorithm paradigms.

== History ==
It was first used by Lawrence J. Fogel in the US in 1960 in order to use simulated evolution as a learning process aiming to generate artificial intelligence. It was used to evolve finite-state machines as predictors.

Timeline of EP - selected algorithms
Year	Description	Reference
1966	EP introduced by Fogel et al.	
1992	Improved fast EP - Cauchy mutation is used instead of Gaussian mutation	
2002	Generalized EP - usage of Lévy-type mutation	
2012	Diversity-guided EP - Mutation step size is guided by diversity	
2013	Adaptive EP - The number of successful mutations determines the strategy parameter	
2014	Social EP - Social cognitive model is applied meaning replacing individuals with cognitive agents	
2015	Immunised EP - Artificial immune system inspired mutation and selection	
2016	Mixed mutation strategy EP - Gaussian, Cauchy and Lévy mutations are used	
2017	Fast Convergence EP - An algorithm, which boosts convergence speed and solution quality	
2017	Immune log-normal EP - log-normal mutation combined with artificial immune system	
2018	ADM-EP - automatically designed mutation operators	

== See also ==
- Genetic algorithm
- Genetic operator
