= Gaussian adaptation =

Evolutionary algorithm designed for maximizing manufacturing yield

Gaussian adaptation (GA), also called normal or natural adaptation (NA) is an evolutionary algorithm designed for the maximization of manufacturing yield due to statistical deviation of component values of signal processing systems. In short, GA is a stochastic adaptive process where a number of samples of an n-dimensional vector x[x^{T} = (x_{1}, x_{2}, ..., x_{n})] are taken from a multivariate Gaussian distribution, N(m, M), having mean m and moment matrix M. The samples are tested for fail or pass. The first- and second-order moments of the Gaussian restricted to the pass samples are m* and M*.

The outcome of x as a pass sample is determined by a function s(x), 0 < s(x) < q ≤ 1, such that s(x) is the probability that x will be selected as a pass sample. The average probability of finding pass samples (yield) is

$$P(m) = \int s(x) N(x - m)\, dx$$

Then the theorem of GA states:

For any s(x) and for any value of P < q, there always exist a Gaussian p. d. f. [ probability density function ] that is adapted for maximum dispersion. The necessary conditions for a local optimum are m = m* and M proportional to M*. The dual problem is also solved: P is maximized while keeping the dispersion constant (Kjellström, 1991).

Proofs of the theorem may be found in the papers by Kjellström, 1970, and Kjellström & Taxén, 1981.

Since dispersion is defined as the exponential of entropy/disorder/average information it immediately follows that the theorem is valid also for those concepts. Altogether, this means that Gaussian adaptation may carry out a simultaneous maximisation of yield and average information (without any need for the yield or the average information to be defined as criterion functions).

The theorem is valid for all regions of acceptability and all Gaussian distributions. It may be used by cyclic repetition of random variation and selection (like the natural evolution). In every cycle a sufficiently large number of Gaussian distributed points are sampled and tested for membership in the region of acceptability. The centre of gravity of the Gaussian, m, is then moved to the centre of gravity of the approved (selected) points, m*. Thus, the process converges to a state of equilibrium fulfilling the theorem. A solution is always approximate because the centre of gravity is always determined for a limited number of points.

It was used for the first time in 1969 as a pure optimization algorithm making the regions of acceptability smaller and smaller (in analogy to simulated annealing, Kirkpatrick 1983). Since 1970 it has been used for both ordinary optimization and yield maximization.

== Natural evolution and Gaussian adaptation ==
It has also been compared to the natural evolution of populations of living organisms. In this case s(x) is the probability that the individual having an array x of phenotypes will survive by giving offspring to the next generation; a definition of individual fitness given by Hartl 1981. The yield, P, is replaced by the mean fitness determined as a mean over the set of individuals in a large population.

Phenotypes are often Gaussian distributed in a large population and a necessary condition for the natural evolution to be able to fulfill the theorem of Gaussian adaptation, with respect to all Gaussian quantitative characters, is that it may push the centre of gravity of the Gaussian to the centre of gravity of the selected individuals. This may be accomplished by the Hardy–Weinberg law. This is possible because the theorem of Gaussian adaptation is valid for any region of acceptability independent of the structure (Kjellström, 1996).

In this case the rules of genetic variation such as crossover, inversion, transposition etcetera may be seen as random number generators for the phenotypes. So, in this sense Gaussian adaptation may be seen as a genetic algorithm.

== How to climb a mountain ==
Mean fitness may be calculated provided that the distribution of parameters and the structure of the landscape is known. The real landscape is not known, but figure below shows a fictitious profile (blue) of a landscape along a line (x) in a room spanned by such parameters. The red curve is the mean based on the red bell curve at the bottom of figure. It is obtained by letting the bell curve slide along the x-axis, calculating the mean at every location. As can be seen, small peaks and pits are smoothed out. Thus, if evolution is started at A with a relatively small variance (the red bell curve), then climbing will take place on the red curve. The process may get stuck for millions of years at B or C, as long as the hollows to the right of these points remain, and the mutation rate is too small.

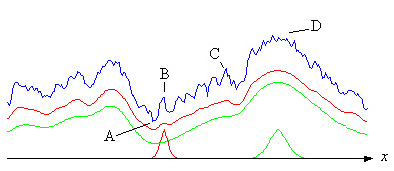

If the mutation rate is sufficiently high, the disorder or variance may increase and the parameter(s) may become distributed like the green bell curve. Then the climbing will take place on the green curve, which is even more smoothed out. Because the hollows to the right of B and C have now disappeared, the process may continue up to the peaks at D. But of course the landscape puts a limit on the disorder or variability. Besides — dependent on the landscape — the process may become very jerky, and if the ratio between the time spent by the process at a local peak and the time of transition to the next peak is very high, it may as well look like a punctuated equilibrium as suggested by Gould (see Ridley).

== Computer simulation of Gaussian adaptation ==
Thus far the theory only considers mean values of continuous distributions corresponding to an infinite number of individuals. In reality however, the number of individuals is always limited, which gives rise to an uncertainty in the estimation of m and M (the moment matrix of the Gaussian). And this may also affect the efficiency of the process. Unfortunately very little is known about this, at least theoretically.

The implementation of normal adaptation on a computer is a fairly simple task. The adaptation of m may be done by one sample (individual) at a time, for example

m(i + 1) = (1 – a) m(i) + ax

where x is a pass sample, and a < 1 a suitable constant so that the inverse of a represents the number of individuals in the population.

M may in principle be updated after every step y leading to a feasible point

x = m + y according to:

M(i + 1) = (1 – 2b) M(i) + 2byy^{T},

where y^{T} is the transpose of y and b << 1 is another suitable constant. In order to guarantee a suitable increase of average information, y should be normally distributed with moment matrix μ^{2}M, where the scalar μ > 1 is used to increase average information (information entropy, disorder, diversity) at a suitable rate. But M will never be used in the calculations. Instead we use the matrix W defined by WW^{T} = M.

Thus, we have y = Wg, where g is normally distributed with the moment matrix μU, and U is the unit matrix. W and W^{T} may be updated by the formulas

W = (1 – b)W + byg^{T} and W^{T} = (1 – b)W^{T} + bgy^{T}

because multiplication gives

M = (1 – 2b)M + 2byy^{T},

where terms including b^{2} have been neglected. Thus, M will be indirectly adapted with good approximation. In practice it will suffice to update W only

W(i + 1) = (1 – b)W(i) + byg^{T}.

This is the formula used in a simple 2-dimensional model of a brain satisfying the Hebbian rule of associative learning; see the next section (Kjellström, 1996 and 1999).

The figure below illustrates the effect of increased average information in a Gaussian p.d.f. used to climb a mountain Crest (the two lines represent the contour line). Both the red and green cluster have equal mean fitness, about 65%, but the green cluster has a much higher average information making the green process much more efficient. The effect of this adaptation is not very salient in a 2-dimensional case, but in a high-dimensional case, the efficiency of the search process may be increased by many orders of magnitude.

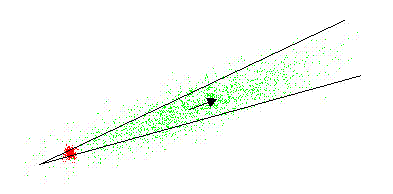

== The evolution in the brain ==
In the brain the evolution of DNA-messages is supposed to be replaced by an evolution of signal patterns and the phenotypic landscape is replaced by a mental landscape, the complexity of which will hardly be second to the former. The metaphor with the mental landscape is based on the assumption that certain signal patterns give rise to a better well-being or performance. For instance, the control of a group of muscles leads to a better pronunciation of a word or performance of a piece of music.

In this simple model it is assumed that the brain consists of interconnected components that may add, multiply and delay signal values.

- A nerve cell kernel may add signal values,
- a synapse may multiply with a constant and
- An axon may delay values.

This is a basis of the theory of digital filters and neural networks consisting of components that may add, multiply and delay signalvalues and also of many brain models, Levine 1991.

In the figure below the brain stem is supposed to deliver Gaussian distributed signal patterns. This may be possible since certain neurons fire at random (Kandel et al.). The stem also constitutes a disordered structure surrounded by more ordered shells (Bergström, 1969), and according to the central limit theorem the sum of signals from many neurons may be Gaussian distributed. The triangular boxes represent synapses and the boxes with the + sign are cell kernels.

In the cortex signals are supposed to be tested for feasibility. When a signal is accepted the contact areas in the synapses are updated according to the formulas below in agreement with the Hebbian theory. The figure shows a 2-dimensional computer simulation of Gaussian adaptation according to the last formula in the preceding section.

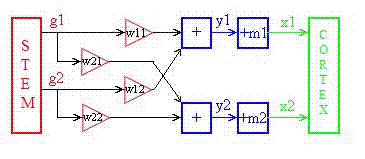

m and W are updated according to:

m_{1} = 0.9 m_{1} + 0.1 x1; m_{2} = 0.9 m_{2} + 0.1 x_{2};

w_{11} = 0.9 w_{11} + 0.1 y_{1}g_{1}; w_{12} = 0.9 w_{12} + 0.1 y_{1}g_{2};

w_{21} = 0.9 w_{21} + 0.1 y_{2}g_{1}; w_{22} = 0.9 w_{22} + 0.1 y_{2}g_{2};

As can be seen this is very much like a small brain ruled by the theory of Hebbian learning (Kjellström, 1996, 1999 and 2002).

== Gaussian adaptation and free will ==
Gaussian adaptation as an evolutionary model of the brain obeying the Hebbian theory of associative learning offers an alternative view of free will due to the ability of the process to maximize the mean fitness of signal patterns in the brain by climbing a mental landscape in analogy with phenotypic evolution.

Such a random process gives us much freedom of choice, but hardly any will. An illusion of will may, however, emanate from the ability of the process to maximize mean fitness, making the process goal seeking. I. e., it prefers higher peaks in the landscape prior to lower, or better alternatives prior to worse. In this way an illusive will may appear. A similar view has been given by Zohar 1990. See also Kjellström 1999.

== A theorem of efficiency for random search ==
The efficiency of Gaussian adaptation relies on the theory of information due to Claude E. Shannon (see information content). When an event occurs with probability P, then the information −log(P) may be achieved. For instance, if the mean fitness is P, the information gained for each individual selected for survival will be −log(P) – on the average - and the work/time needed to get the information is proportional to 1/P. Thus, if efficiency, E, is defined as information divided by the work/time needed to get it we have:

E = −P log(P).

This function attains its maximum when P = 1/e = 0.37. The same result has been obtained by Gaines with a different method.

E = 0 if P = 0, for a process with infinite mutation rate, and if P = 1, for a process with mutation rate = 0 (provided that the process is alive). This measure of efficiency is valid for a large class of random search processes provided that certain conditions are at hand.

1 The search should be statistically independent and equally efficient in different parameter directions. This condition may be approximately fulfilled when the moment matrix of the Gaussian has been adapted for maximum average information to some region of acceptability, because linear transformations of the whole process do not affect efficiency.

2 All individuals have equal cost and the derivative at P = 1 is < 0.

Then, the following theorem may be proved:

All measures of efficiency, that satisfy the conditions above, are asymptotically proportional to –P log(P/q) when the number of dimensions increases, and are maximized by P = q exp(-1) (Kjellström, 1996 and 1999).

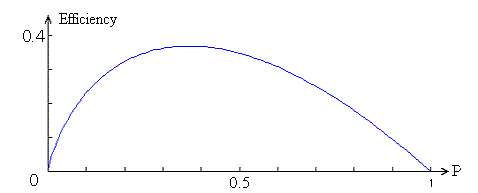

The figure above shows a possible efficiency function for a random search process such as Gaussian adaptation. To the left the process is most chaotic when P = 0, while there is perfect order to the right where P = 1.

In an example by Rechenberg, 1971, 1973, a random walk is pushed thru a corridor maximizing the parameter x_{1}. In this case the region of acceptability is defined as a (n − 1)-dimensional interval in the parameters x_{2}, x_{3}, ..., x_{n}, but a x_{1}-value below the last accepted will never be accepted. Since P can never exceed 0.5 in this case, the maximum speed towards higher x_{1}-values is reached for P = 0.5/e = 0.18, in agreement with the findings of Rechenberg.

A point of view that also may be of interest in this context is that no definition of information (other than that sampled points inside some region of acceptability gives information about the extension of the region) is needed for the proof of the theorem. Then, because, the formula may be interpreted as information divided by the work needed to get the information, this is also an indication that −log(P) is a good candidate for being a measure of information.

== The Stauffer and Grimson algorithm ==
Gaussian adaptation has also been used for other purposes as for instance shadow removal by "The Stauffer-Grimson algorithm" which is equivalent to Gaussian adaptation as used in the section "Computer simulation of Gaussian adaptation" above. In both cases the maximum likelihood method is used for estimation of mean values by adaptation at one sample at a time.

But there are differences. In the Stauffer-Grimson case the information is not used for the control of a random number generator for centering, maximization of mean fitness, average information or manufacturing yield. The adaptation of the moment matrix also differs very much as compared to "the evolution in the brain" above.

== See also ==
- Entropy in thermodynamics and information theory
- Fisher's fundamental theorem of natural selection
- Free will
- Genetic algorithm
- Hebbian learning
- Information content
- Simulated annealing
- Stochastic optimization
- Covariance matrix adaptation evolution strategy (CMA-ES)
- Unit of selection
