= Ingo Rechenberg =

German researcher and academic (1934–2021)

Ingo Rechenberg (20 November 1934 – 25 September 2021) was a German researcher and professor in the field of bionics. Rechenberg was a pioneer of the fields of evolutionary computation and artificial evolution. In the 1960s and 1970s he invented a highly influential set of optimization methods known as evolution strategies (from German Evolutionsstrategie). His group successfully applied the new algorithms to challenging problems such as aerodynamic wing design. These were the first serious technical applications of artificial evolution, an important subset of the still growing field of bionics.

Rechenberg was born in Berlin. He was educated at Technische Universität Berlin and at the University of Cambridge. Since 1972 he was a full professor at TU Berlin, where he headed the Department of Bionics and Evolution Techniques.

His awards include the Lifetime Achievement Award of the Evolutionary Programming Society (US, 1995) and the Evolutionary Computation Pioneer Award of the IEEE Neural Networks Society (US, 2002). In 1954, Rechenberg also became world champion in the field of model aeroplanes.

The Moroccan flic-flac spider, Cebrennus rechenbergi, was named in his honor, as he first collected specimens in the Moroccan desert.

Rechenberg died on 25 September 2021, at the age of 86.

== Selected bibliography ==
- Ingo Rechenberg (1971): Evolutionsstrategie - Optimierung technischer Systeme nach Prinzipien der biologischen Evolution, (PhD thesis). Reprinted by Fromman-Holzboog, Stuttgart (1973), ISBN 3-7728-0373-3.
- Ingo Rechenberg: Evolutionsstrategie '94. Also includes Evolutionsstrategie (1973). Stuttgart: Frommann-Holzboog (1994), ISBN 978-3-7728-1642-0.
