= Harry Benson (disambiguation) =

Harry Benson (born 1929) is a Scottish photographer.

Harry Benson may also refer to:

- Harry Benson (footballer) (1883–1953), English footballer
- Harry Benson (American football) (1909–1943), American football player
- Harry Benson, a 19th-century con artist - see Trial of the Detectives

== See also ==
- Henry Benson (disambiguation)
- Harold Benson, see Benson's algorithm
