= Roberto Battiti =

Italian academic

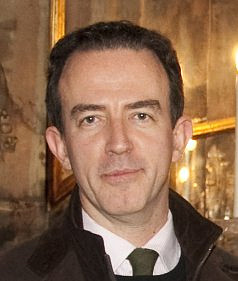
- Roberto Battiti (2010)
- Born: 1961 (age 64–65); Italy
- Education: University of Trento
- Known for: Reactive Search Optimization
- Awards: Fellow of the IEEE
- Scientific career
- Doctoral advisor: Geoffrey C. Fox

Roberto Battiti (born 1961) is an Italian computer scientist, Professor of computer science at the University of Trento, director of the LIONlab (Learning and Intelligent Optimization), and deputy director of the DISI Department (Information Engineering and Computer Science) and delegate for technology transfer.

== Biography ==
Battiti received the Laurea degree in physics from the University of Trento in 1985, and the Ph.D. in Computation and Neural Systems from the California Institute of Technology in 1990 under supervision of Geoffrey C. Fox.

His main research interests are heuristic algorithms for problem-solving, in particular Reactive Search Optimization, which aims at embodying solvers with internal machine learning techniques, data mining and visualization.

Battiti was elected Fellow of the Institute of Electrical and Electronics Engineers in 2009, in recognition of his "contributions to machine learning techniques for intelligent optimization and neural networks", is author of highly cited publications.

He wrote the books The LION way. Machine Learning plus Intelligent Optimization. and Reactive Business Intelligence. From Data to Models to Insight. (with Mauro Brunato), about integrating data mining, modeling, optimization and interactive visualization, into an end-to-end discovery and continuous innovation process powered by human and automated learning. His ideas form the basis of the Grapheur and LIONsolver software.

== See also ==
- Grapheur
- LIONsolver
- Reactive search optimization
- Reactive business intelligence

== Selected publications ==
- Battiti, Roberto; Mauro Brunato (2011). Reactive Business Intelligence. From Data to Models to Insight. Trento, Italy: Reactive Search Srl. ISBN 978-88-905795-0-9.
- Battiti, Roberto; Mauro Brunato (2014). The LION way. Machine Learning plus Intelligent Optimization. Trento, Italy: LIONlab, University of Trento. ISBN 978-1-4960-3402-1.

Articles, a selection:

- Battiti, Roberto (1992). "First- and second-order methods for learning: Between steepest descent and newton's method" (PDF). Neural Computation. 4 (2): 141–166. doi:10.1162/neco.1992.4.2.141. S2CID 27960650.
- Battiti, Roberto; Gianpietro Tecchiolli (1994). "The reactive tabu search" (PDF). ORSA Journal on Computing. 6 (2): 126–140. doi:10.1287/ijoc.6.2.126.
- Battiti, Roberto; Gianpietro Tecchiolli (1995). "Training neural nets with the reactive tabu search" (PDF). IEEE Transactions on Neural Networks. 6 (5): 1185–1200. doi:10.1109/72.410361. PMID 18263407.
- Battiti, Roberto; Mauro Brunato; Franco Mascia (2008). Reactive Search and Intelligent Optimization. Springer Verlag. ISBN 978-0-387-09623-0.
- Battiti, Roberto; Andrea Passerini (2010). "Brain-Computer Evolutionary Multi-Objective Optimization (BC-EMO): a genetic algorithm adapting to the decision maker" (PDF). IEEE Transactions on Evolutionary Computation. 14 (15): 671–687. doi:10.1109/TEVC.2010.2058118. S2CID 2182650.
