= Jeswald Salacuse =

American lawyer

Jeswald Salacuse was an American lawyer, currently the Henry J. Braker Professor at Fletcher School of Law and Diplomacy, Tufts University, and also the school's former Dean. He is featured in Who's Who in America, Who's Who in the East and Who's Who in American Law, was a Distinguished Professorial Fellow at Queen Mary University of London from 1995 to 2003 and was awarded the Fulbright Distinguished Chair in Comparative Law at University of Trento in 2000. He also served as the Chairman of the Institute for Transnational Arbitration.

== Books ==
- Salacuse, Jeswald W. (2006). Leading leaders: how to manage smart, talented, rich, and powerful people. New York: American Management Association Communication. ISBN 978-0-8144-0855-1.
- Salacuse, Jeswald W. (2000). The Wise Advisor: What Every Professional Should Know About Consulting and Counseling. Bloomsbury Academic. ISBN 978-0-274-66978-3.
