= Multimodal =

Multimodal may refer to:

- Scenic route
- Multimodal distribution, a statistical distribution of values with multiple peaks
- Multimodal interaction, a form of human-machine interaction using multiple modes of input/output
- Multimodal therapy, an approach to psychotherapy
- Multimodal learning, machine learning methods using multiple input modalities
- Multimodal transport, a contract for delivery involving the use of multiple modes of goods transport
- Multimodality, the use of several modes (media) in a single artifact
- Multimodal logic modal logic that has more than one primitive modal operator
- Evolutionary multimodal optimization, finding all or most of the multiple (at least locally optimal) solutions of a problem

== See also ==
- Polymodal (disambiguation)
