= Wallenius =

Wallenius is a surname. Notable people with the surname include:

- Allan Wallenius (1890–1942), Swedish leftist figure and journalist
- Asser Wallenius (1902–1971), Finnish Olympian
- Bror-Erik Wallenius (born 1943), Finnish sports commentator
- Jaakko Wallenius (1958–2013), Finnish writer and journalist
- Jami Wallenius (born 1967), Finnish football coach and former player
- Janne Wallenius (born 1968), Swedish reactor physicist
- Johan Fredrik Wallenius (1765–1836), Finnish botanist and physician
- Juhani Wallenius (1956–2014), Finnish ice hockey player
- Kurt Martti Wallenius (1893–1984), Finnish Major General
- Leo Sahlin Wallenius (born 2004), Swedish ice hockey player
- Olof Wallenius (1902–1970), Swedish entrepreneur
- Ville Wallenius, Finnish guitarist who plays in the power metal band Twilightning

== See also ==
- Wallenius' noncentral hypergeometric distribution, generalization of the hypergeometric distribution where items are sampled with bias
- Wallenius Lines, privately owned Swedish shipping company included in the Soya Group
- Wallenius Wilhelmsen Logistics, privately owned Norwegian/Swedish shipping company
- Zionts–Wallenius method, used to find a best solution to a multi-criteria optimization problem
