= Multi-objective linear programming =

Subarea of mathematical optimization

Multi-objective linear programming is a subarea of mathematical optimization. A multiple objective linear program (MOLP) is a linear program with more than one objective function. An MOLP is a special case of a vector linear program. Multi-objective linear programming is also a subarea of Multi-objective optimization.

== Problem formulation ==
In mathematical terms, a MOLP can be written as:

$$\min_x Px \quad\text{s.t.}\quad a \leq Bx \leq b,\; \ell \leq x \leq u$$

where $B$ is an $(m\times n)$ matrix, $P$ is a $(q\times n)$ matrix, $a$ is an $m$-dimensional vector with components in $\mathbb{R} \cup \{-\infty\}$, $b$ is an $m$-dimensional vector with components in $\mathbb{R} \cup \{+\infty\}$, $\ell$ is an $n$-dimensional vector with components in $\mathbb{R} \cup \{-\infty\}$, $u$ is an $n$-dimensional vector with components in $\mathbb{R} \cup \{+\infty\}$

== Solution concepts ==
A feasible point $x$ is called efficient if there is no feasible point $y$ with $Px \leq Py$, $Px \neq Py$, where $\leq$ denotes the component-wise ordering.

Often in the literature, the aim in multiple objective linear programming is to compute the set of all efficient extremal points..... There are also algorithms to determine the set of all maximal efficient faces. Based on these goals, the set of all efficient (extreme) points can be seen to be the solution of MOLP. This type of solution concept is called decision set based. It is not compatible with an optimal solution of a linear program but rather parallels the set of all optimal solutions of a linear program (which is more difficult to determine).

Efficient points are frequently called efficient solutions. This term is misleading because a single efficient point can be already obtained by solving one linear program, such as the linear program with the same feasible set and the objective function being the sum of the objectives of MOLP.

More recent references consider outcome set based solution concepts and corresponding algorithms. Assume MOLP is bounded, i.e. there is some $y \in \mathbb{R}^q$ such that $y \leq Px$ for all feasible $x$. A solution of MOLP is defined to be a finite subset $\bar S$ of efficient points that carries a sufficient amount of information in order to describe the upper image of MOLP. Denoting by $S$ the feasible set of MOLP, the upper image of MOLP is the set $\mathcal{P}:=P[ S] + \mathbb{R}^q_+ := \{ y \in \mathbb{R}^q:\; \exists x \in S: y \geq Px \}$. A formal definition of a solution is as follows:

A finite set $\bar S$ of efficient points is called solution to MOLP if $\operatorname{conv} P[\bar S] + \mathbb{R}^q_+ = \mathcal{P}$ ("conv" denotes the convex hull).

If MOLP is not bounded, a solution consists not only of points but of points and directions

== Solution methods ==
Multiobjective variants of the simplex algorithm are used to compute decision set based solutions and objective set based solutions.

Objective set based solutions can be obtained by Benson's algorithm.

== Related problem classes ==
Multiobjective linear programming is equivalent to polyhedral projection.
