= Henry Benson =

Henry Benson may refer to:

- Henry L. Benson (1854–1921), American politician and jurist in the state of Oregon
- Henry Benson (MP) (c. 1578–1643), English politician who sat in the House of Commons variously between 1626 and 1641
- Henry Roxby Benson (1818–1892), British general
- Henry Benson, Baron Benson (1909–1995), British accountant
- Henry N. Benson (1872–1960), American lawyer and politician
- Henry Benson (soldier) (1824–1862), American artillery officer

== See also ==
- Harry Benson (disambiguation)
