= Polymodal =

Polymodal is having multiple modes or modalities. Examples include:

- Polymodality, multiple stimulus modalities (e.g. free nerve endings)
- Polytonality, multiple musical modes

== See also ==
- Multimodal (disambiguation)
