= Harold Benson =

American researcher and mathematician

Harold Philip Benson
- Born: 1949 (age 76–77)
- Education: University of Michigan (B.S.), Mathematics; Northwestern University (M.S. and PhD), Industrial Engineering and the Management Sciences
- Occupations: mathematician, operations researcher, professor

Harold Philip Benson (born 1949) is an American operations researcher, mathematician, and professor. He is best known for his work in multiple-criteria decision making (MCDM) and for formulating Benson's algorithm in the field of linear programming. He served as an American Economic Institutions professor at the University of Florida.

== Education ==
Benson graduated from the University of Michigan with a B.S. in Mathematics in 1971. He was a member of the university's Phi Beta Kappa chapter. He also earned an M.S. and PhD in Industrial Engineering and the Management Sciences from Northwestern University in 1973 and 1976, respectively.

== Career ==
Benson worked as a research engineer at the General Motors Research Laboratory from 1976 to 1979. After leaving his position at General Motors Research Laboratory in 1979, Benson was hired as a professor at the University of Florida’s Warrington College of Business, where he taught until 2013.

Benson has served as an associate editor for academic journals such as the Journal of Mathematical Analysis and Applications, Naval Research Logistics, and the Journal of Optimization Theory and Applications. Benson was also a founding member of the multiple-criteria decision making section of the Institute for Operations Research and the Management Sciences (INFORMS) when it was established in 2010.

== Research ==
Benson's research mainly concerns multiple-criteria decision making (MCDM), global optimization, and their applications.

He invented what is now called Benson's algorithm, which finds all of the efficient extreme points and the full weakly efficient set in the outcome set of a multiple objective linear program. A computer code called BENSOLVE was developed to execute this algorithm.

Benson also helped to define and explore properly efficient solutions of nonlinear vector optimization problems. In global optimization, he focused a good portion of his work on the theory and solutions for concave minimization problems. During the 1990s, Benson's MCDM work included research on optimization over the efficient set and on generating the complete set of efficient and extreme point efficient solutions in the decision and criterion spaces of multiple objective mathematical programming problems.

== Awards and honors ==
In 2004, Benson received the Georg Cantor Award from the International Society on Multiple Criteria Decision Making for his contributions to the theory, methodology, and practices of multiple-criteria decision making.

In the book Multiple Criteria Decision Making: From Early History to the 21st Century, which was published in 2011, Benson was named one of the 42 world-leading researchers in the history of MCDM. In 2018, a special issue of the Journal of Optimization Theory and Applications was dedicated to Benson.
