= LIONsolver =

Software product

- Developer(s): Reactive Search srl
- Stable release: 2.0.198 / October 9, 2011; 13 years ago
- Operating system: Windows, Mac OS X, Unix
- Available in: English
- Type: Business intelligence software
- License: Proprietary software, free for academic use
- Website: lionoso.com

LIONsolver is an integrated software for data mining, business intelligence, analytics, and modeling and reactive business intelligence approach. A non-profit version is also available as LIONoso.

LIONsolver is used to build models, visualize them, and improve business and engineering processes.

It is a tool for decision making based on data and quantitative model and it can be connected to most databases and external programs.

The software is fully integrated with the Grapheur business intelligence and intended for more advanced users.

== Overview ==
LIONsolver originates from research principles in Reactive Search Optimization advocating the use of self-tuning schemes acting while a software system is running. Learning and Intelligent OptimizatioN refers to the integration of online machine learning schemes into the optimization software, so that it becomes capable of learning from its previous runs and from human feedback. A related approach is that of Programming by Optimization, which provides a direct way of defining design spaces involving Reactive Search Optimization, and of Autonomous Search advocating adapting problem-solving algorithms.

Version 2.0 of the software was released on Oct 1, 2011, covering also the Unix and Mac OS X operating systems in addition to Windows.

The modeling components include neural networks, polynomials, locally weighted Bayesian regression, k-means clustering, and self-organizing maps. A free academic license for non-commercial use and class use is available.

The software architecture of LIONsolver permits interactive multi-objective optimization, with a user interface for visualizing the results and facilitating the solution analysis and decision-making process. The architecture allows for problem-specific extensions, and it is applicable as a post-processing tool for all optimization schemes with a number of different potential solutions. When the architecture is tightly coupled to a specific problem-solving or optimization method, effective interactive schemes where the final decision maker is in the loop can be developed.

On Apr 24, 2013 LIONsolver received the first prize of the Michael J. Fox Foundation – Kaggle Parkinson's Data Challenge, a contest leveraging "the wisdom of the crowd" to benefit people with Parkinson's disease.

== See also ==
- Multi-objective optimization
