= Multi-objective optimization =

Mathematical concept

In multiple-criteria decision making, multi-objective optimization or Pareto optimization (also known as multi-objective programming, vector optimization, multicriteria optimization, or multiattribute optimization) is concerned with mathematical optimization problems involving more than one objective function to be optimized simultaneously. Multi-objective is a type of vector optimization that has been applied in many fields of science, including engineering, economics and logistics where optimal decisions need to be taken in the presence of trade-offs between two or more conflicting objectives. Minimizing cost while maximizing comfort while buying a car, and maximizing performance whilst minimizing fuel consumption and emission of pollutants of a vehicle are examples of multi-objective optimization problems involving two and three objectives, respectively. In practical problems, there can be more than three objectives.

For a multi-objective optimization problem, it is not guaranteed that a single solution simultaneously optimizes each objective. The objective functions are said to be conflicting. A solution is called nondominated, Pareto optimal, Pareto efficient or noninferior, if none of the objective functions can be improved in value without degrading some of the other objective values. Without additional subjective preference information, there may exist a (possibly infinite) number of Pareto optimal solutions, all of which are considered equally good. Researchers study multi-objective optimization problems from different viewpoints and, thus, there exist different solution philosophies and goals when setting and solving them. The goal may be to find a representative set of Pareto optimal solutions, and/or quantify the trade-offs in satisfying the different objectives, and/or finding a single solution that satisfies the subjective preferences of a human decision maker (DM).

Bicriteria optimization denotes the special case in which there are two objective functions.

There is a direct relationship between multitask optimization and multi-objective optimization.

== Introduction ==
A multi-objective optimization problem is an optimization problem that involves multiple objective functions. In mathematical terms, a multi-objective optimization problem can be formulated as

$$\min_{x \in X} (f_1(x), f_2(x),\ldots, f_k(x))$$

where the integer $k\geq 2$ is the number of objectives and the set $X$ is the feasible set of decision vectors, which is typically $X \subseteq \mathbb R^n$ but it depends on the $n$-dimensional application domain. The feasible set is typically defined by some constraint functions. In addition, the vector-valued objective function is often defined as

$$\begin{align}
f : X &\to \mathbb R^k \\
x &\mapsto
\begin{pmatrix}
f_1(x) \\
\vdots \\
f_k(x)
\end{pmatrix}
\end{align}$$

Example of a Pareto frontier (in red), the set of Pareto optimal solutions (those that are not dominated by any other feasible solutions). The boxed points represent feasible choices, and smaller values are preferred to larger ones. Point C is not on the Pareto frontier because it is dominated by both point A and point B. Points A and B are not strictly dominated by any other, and hence do lie on the frontier.

If some objective function is to be maximized, it is equivalent to minimize its negative or its inverse. We denote $Y \subseteq \mathbb R^k$ the image of $X$; $x^*\in X$ a feasible solution or feasible decision; and $z^* = f(x^*) \in \mathbb R^k$an objective vector or an outcome.

In multi-objective optimization, there does not typically exist a feasible solution that minimizes all objective functions simultaneously. Therefore, attention is paid to Pareto optimal solutions; that is, solutions that cannot be improved in any of the objectives without degrading at least one of the other objectives. In mathematical terms, a feasible solution $x_1\in X$ is said to (Pareto) dominate another solution $x_2\in X$, if

1. $\forall i \in \{1, \dots, k\}, f_i(x_1) \leq f_i(x_2)$, and
2. $\exists i \in \{1, \dots, k\}, f_i(x_1) < f_i(x_2)$.

A solution $x^*\in X$ (and the corresponding outcome $f(x^*)$) is called Pareto optimal if there does not exist another solution that dominates it. The set of Pareto optimal outcomes, denoted $X^*$, is often called the Pareto frontier, Pareto front, or Pareto boundary.

The Pareto front of a multi-objective optimization problem is bounded by a so-called nadir objective vector $z^{nadir}$and an ideal objective vector $z^{ideal}$, if these are finite. The nadir objective vector is defined as

$$z^{nadir} = \begin{pmatrix}
\sup_{x^* \in X^*} f_1(x^*) \\
\vdots \\
\sup_{x^* \in X^*} f_k(x^*)
\end{pmatrix}$$

and the ideal objective vector as

$$z^{ideal} = \begin{pmatrix}
\inf_{x^* \in X^*} f_1(x^*) \\
\vdots \\
\inf_{x^* \in X^*} f_k(x^*)
\end{pmatrix}$$

In other words, the components of the nadir and ideal objective vectors define the upper and lower bounds of the objective function of Pareto optimal solutions. In practice, the nadir objective vector can only be approximated as, typically, the whole Pareto optimal set is unknown. In addition, a utopian objective vector $z^{utop}$, such that $z^{utop}_i = z^{ideal}_{i} - \epsilon, \forall i \in \{1, \dots , k\}$ where $\epsilon>0$ is a small constant, is often defined because of numerical reasons.

== Examples of applications ==
=== Economics ===
In economics, many problems involve multiple objectives along with constraints on what combinations of those objectives are attainable. For example, consumer's demand for various goods is determined by the process of maximization of the utilities derived from those goods, subject to a constraint based on how much income is available to spend on those goods and on the prices of those goods. This constraint allows more of one good to be purchased only at the sacrifice of consuming less of another good; therefore, the various objectives (more consumption of each good is preferred) are in conflict with each other. A common method for analyzing such a problem is to use a graph of indifference curves, representing preferences, and a budget constraint, representing the trade-offs that the consumer is faced with.

Another example involves the production possibilities frontier, which specifies what combinations of various types of goods can be produced by a society with certain amounts of various resources. The frontier specifies the trade-offs that the society is faced with — if the society is fully utilizing its resources, more of one good can be produced only at the expense of producing less of another good. A society must then use some process to choose among the possibilities on the frontier.

Macroeconomic policy-making is a context requiring multi-objective optimization. Typically a central bank must choose a stance for monetary policy that balances competing objectives — low inflation, low unemployment, low balance of trade deficit, etc. To do this, the central bank uses a model of the economy that quantitatively describes the various causal linkages in the economy; it simulates the model repeatedly under various possible stances of monetary policy, in order to obtain a menu of possible predicted outcomes for the various variables of interest. Then in principle it can use an aggregate objective function to rate the alternative sets of predicted outcomes, although in practice central banks use a non-quantitative, judgement-based, process for ranking the alternatives and making the policy choice.

=== Finance ===
In finance, a common problem is to choose a portfolio when there are two conflicting objectives — the desire to have the expected value of portfolio returns be as high as possible, and the desire to have risk, often measured by the standard deviation of portfolio returns, be as low as possible. This problem is often represented by a graph in which the efficient frontier shows the best combinations of risk and expected return that are available, and in which indifference curves show the investor's preferences for various risk-expected return combinations. The problem of optimizing a function of the expected value (first moment) and the standard deviation (square root of the second central moment) of portfolio return is called a two-moment decision model.

=== Optimal control ===
In engineering and economics, many problems involve multiple objectives which are not describable as the-more-the-better or the-less-the-better; instead, there is an ideal target value for each objective, and the desire is to get as close as possible to the desired value of each objective. For example, energy systems typically have a trade-off between performance and cost or one might want to adjust a rocket's fuel usage and orientation so that it arrives both at a specified place and at a specified time; or one might want to conduct open market operations so that both the inflation rate and the unemployment rate are as close as possible to their desired values.

Often such problems are subject to linear equality constraints that prevent all objectives from being simultaneously perfectly met, especially when the number of controllable variables is less than the number of objectives and when the presence of random shocks generates uncertainty. Commonly a multi-objective quadratic objective function is used, with the cost associated with an objective rising quadratically with the distance of the objective from its ideal value. Since these problems typically involve adjusting the controlled variables at various points in time and/or evaluating the objectives at various points in time, intertemporal optimization techniques are employed.

=== Optimal design ===
Product and process design can be largely improved using modern modeling, simulation, and optimization techniques. The key question in optimal design is measuring what is good or desirable about a design. Before looking for optimal designs, it is important to identify characteristics that contribute the most to the overall value of the design. A good design typically involves multiple criteria/objectives such as capital cost/investment, operating cost, profit, quality and/or product recovery, efficiency, process safety, operation time, etc. Therefore, in practical applications, the performance of process and product design is often measured with respect to multiple objectives. These objectives are typically conflicting, i.e., achieving the optimal value for one objective requires some compromise on one or more objectives.

For example, when designing a paper mill, one can seek to decrease the amount of capital invested in a paper mill and enhance the quality of paper simultaneously. If the design of a paper mill is defined by large storage volumes and paper quality is defined by quality parameters, then the problem of optimal design of a paper mill can include objectives such as i) minimization of expected variation of those quality parameters from their nominal values, ii) minimization of the expected time of breaks and iii) minimization of the investment cost of storage volumes. Here, the maximum volume of towers is a design variable. This example of optimal design of a paper mill is a simplification of the model used in. Multi-objective design optimization has also been implemented in engineering systems in the circumstances such as control cabinet layout optimization, airfoil shape optimization using scientific workflows, design of nano-CMOS, system on chip design, design of solar-powered irrigation systems, optimization of sand mould systems, engine design, optimal sensor deployment and optimal controller design.

=== Process optimization ===
Multi-objective optimization has been increasingly employed in chemical engineering and manufacturing. In 2009, Fiandaca and Fraga used the multi-objective genetic algorithm (MOGA) to optimize the pressure swing adsorption process (cyclic separation process). The design problem involved the dual maximization of nitrogen recovery and nitrogen purity. The results approximated the Pareto frontier well with acceptable trade-offs between the objectives.

In 2010, Sendín et al. solved a multi-objective problem for the thermal processing of food. They tackled two case studies (bi-objective and triple-objective problems) with nonlinear dynamic models. They used a hybrid approach consisting of the weighted Tchebycheff and the Normal Boundary Intersection approach. The novel hybrid approach was able to construct a Pareto optimal set for the thermal processing of foods.

In 2013, Ganesan et al. carried out the multi-objective optimization of the combined carbon dioxide reforming and partial oxidation of methane. The objective functions were methane conversion, carbon monoxide selectivity, and hydrogen to carbon monoxide ratio. Ganesan used the Normal Boundary Intersection (NBI) method in conjunction with two swarm-based techniques (Gravitational Search Algorithm (GSA) and Particle Swarm Optimization (PSO)) to tackle the problem. Applications involving chemical extraction and bioethanol production processes have posed similar multi-objective problems.

In 2013, Abakarov et al. proposed an alternative technique to solve multi-objective optimization problems arising in food engineering. The Aggregating Functions Approach, the Adaptive Random Search Algorithm, and the Penalty Functions Approach were used to compute the initial set of the non-dominated or Pareto-optimal solutions. The Analytic Hierarchy Process and Tabular Method were used simultaneously for choosing the best alternative among the computed subset of non-dominated solutions for osmotic dehydration processes.

In 2018, Pearce et al. formulated task allocation to human and robotic workers as a multi-objective optimization problem, considering production time and the ergonomic impact on the human worker as the two objectives considered in the formulation. Their approach used a Mixed-Integer Linear Program to solve the optimization problem for a weighted sum of the two objectives to calculate a set of Pareto optimal solutions. Applying the approach to several manufacturing tasks showed improvements in at least one objective in most tasks and in both objectives in some of the processes.

=== Radio resource management ===
The purpose of radio resource management is to satisfy the data rates that are requested by the users of a cellular network. The main resources are time intervals, frequency blocks, and transmit powers. Each user has its own objective function that, for example, can represent some combination of the data rate, latency, and energy efficiency. These objectives are conflicting since the frequency resources are very scarce, thus there is a need for tight spatial frequency reuse which causes immense inter-user interference if not properly controlled. Multi-user MIMO techniques are nowadays used to reduce the interference by adaptive precoding. The network operator would like to both bring great coverage and high data rates, thus the operator would like to find a Pareto optimal solution that balance the total network data throughput and the user fairness in an appropriate subjective manner.

Radio resource management is often solved by scalarization; that is, selection of a network utility function that tries to balance throughput and user fairness. The choice of utility function has a large impact on the computational complexity of the resulting single-objective optimization problem. For example, the common utility of weighted sum rate gives an NP-hard problem with a complexity that scales exponentially with the number of users, while the weighted max-min fairness utility results in a quasi-convex optimization problem with only a polynomial scaling with the number of users.

=== Electric power systems ===
Reconfiguration, by exchanging the functional links between the elements of the system, represents one of the most important measures which can improve the operational performance of a distribution system. The problem of optimization through the reconfiguration of a power distribution system, in terms of its definition, is a historical single objective problem with constraints. Since 1975, when Merlin and Back introduced the idea of distribution system reconfiguration for active power loss reduction, until nowadays, a lot of researchers have proposed diverse methods and algorithms to solve the reconfiguration problem as a single objective problem. Some authors have proposed Pareto optimality based approaches (including active power losses and reliability indices as objectives). For this purpose, different artificial intelligence based methods have been used: microgenetic, branch exchange, particle swarm optimization and non-dominated sorting genetic algorithm.

=== Inspection of infrastructure ===
Autonomous inspection of infrastructure has the potential to reduce costs, risks and environmental impacts, as well as ensuring better periodic maintenance of inspected assets. Typically, planning such missions has been viewed as a single-objective optimization problem, where one aims to minimize the energy or time spent in inspecting an entire target structure. For complex, real-world structures, however, covering 100% of an inspection target is not feasible, and generating an inspection plan may be better viewed as a multiobjective optimization problem, where one aims to both maximize inspection coverage and minimize time and costs. A recent study has indicated that multiobjective inspection planning indeed has the potential to outperform traditional methods on complex structures

== Solution ==
As multiple Pareto optimal solutions for multi-objective optimization problems usually exist, what it means to solve such a problem is not as straightforward as it is for a conventional single-objective optimization problem. Therefore, different researchers have defined the term "solving a multi-objective optimization problem" in various ways. This section summarizes some of them and the contexts in which they are used. Many methods convert the original problem with multiple objectives into a single-objective optimization problem. This is called a scalarized problem. If the Pareto optimality of the single-objective solutions obtained can be guaranteed, the scalarization is characterized as done neatly.

Solving a multi-objective optimization problem is sometimes understood as approximating or computing all or a representative set of Pareto optimal solutions.

When decision making is emphasized, the objective of solving a multi-objective optimization problem is referred to as supporting a decision maker in finding the most preferred Pareto optimal solution according to their subjective preferences. The underlying assumption is that one solution to the problem must be identified to be implemented in practice. Here, a human decision maker (DM) plays an important role. The DM is expected to be an expert in the problem domain.

The most preferred results can be found using different philosophies. Multi-objective optimization methods can be divided into four classes.

1. In so-called no-preference methods, no DM is expected to be available, but a neutral compromise solution is identified without preference information. The other classes are so-called a priori, a posteriori, and interactive methods, and they all involve preference information from the DM in different ways.
2. In a priori methods, preference information is first asked from the DM, and then a solution best satisfying these preferences is found.
3. In a posteriori methods, a representative set of Pareto optimal solutions is first found, and then the DM must choose one of them.
4. In interactive methods, the decision maker is allowed to search for the most preferred solution iteratively. In each iteration of the interactive method, the DM is shown Pareto optimal solution(s) and describes how the solution(s) could be improved. The information given by the DM is then taken into account while generating new Pareto optimal solution(s) for the DM to study in the next iteration. In this way, the DM learns about the feasibility of their wishes and can concentrate on solutions that are interesting to them. The DM may stop the search whenever they want to.

More information and examples of different methods in the four classes are given in the following sections.

== No-preference methods ==
When a decision maker does not explicitly articulate any preference information, the multi-objective optimization method can be classified as a no-preference method. A well-known example is the method of global criterion, in which a scalarized problem of the form

$$\begin{align}
\min & \|f(x)-z^{ideal}\|\\
\text{s.t. } & x\in X
\end{align}$$

is solved. In the above problem, $\|\cdot\|$ can be any $L_p$ norm, with common choices including $L_1$, $L_2$, and $L_\infty$. The method of global criterion is sensitive to the scaling of the objective functions. Thus, it is recommended that the objectives be normalized into a uniform, dimensionless scale.

== A priori methods ==
A priori methods require that sufficient preference information is expressed before the solution process. Well-known examples of a priori methods include the utility function method, lexicographic method, and goal programming.

=== Utility function method ===
The utility function method assumes the decision maker's utility function is available. A mapping $u\colon Y\rightarrow\mathbb{R}$ is a utility function if for all $\mathbf{y}^1,\mathbf{y}^2\in Y$ it holds that $u(\mathbf{y}^1)>u(\mathbf{y}^2)$ if the decision maker prefers $\mathbf{y}^1$ to $\mathbf{y}^2$, and $u(\mathbf{y}^1)=u(\mathbf{y}^2)$ if the decision maker is indifferent between $\mathbf{y}^1$ and $\mathbf{y}^2$. The utility function specifies an ordering of the decision vectors (recall that vectors can be ordered in many different ways). Once $u$ is obtained, it suffices to solve

$$\max\;u(\mathbf{f}(\mathbf{x}))\text{ subject to }\mathbf{x}\in X,$$

but in practice, it is very difficult to construct a utility function that would accurately represent the decision maker's preferences, particularly since the Pareto front is unknown before the optimization begins.

=== Lexicographic method ===
The lexicographic method assumes that the objectives can be ranked in the order of importance. We assume that the objective functions are in the order of importance so that $f_1$ is the most important and $f_k$ the least important to the decision maker. Subject to this assumption, various methods can be used to attain the lexicographically optimal solution. Note that a goal or target value is not specified for any objective here, which makes it different from the Lexicographic Goal Programming method.

=== Scalarizing ===
Linear scalarization approach is an easy method used to solve multi-objective optimization problem. It consists in aggregating the different optimization functions in a single function. However, this method only allows to find the supported solutions of the problem (i.e. points on the convex hull of the objective set). This animation shows that when the outcome set is not convex, not all efficient solutions can be found.

Scalarizing a multi-objective optimization problem is an a priori method, which means formulating a single-objective optimization problem such that optimal solutions to the single-objective optimization problem are Pareto optimal solutions to the multi-objective optimization problem. In addition, it is often required that every Pareto optimal solution can be reached with some parameters of the scalarization. With different parameters for the scalarization, different Pareto optimal solutions are produced. A general formulation for a scalarization of a multi-objective optimization problem is

$$\begin{array}{ll}
\min & g(f_1(x),\ldots,f_k(x),\theta)\\
\text{s.t.} & x\in X_\theta
\end{array}$$

where $\theta$ is a vector parameter, the set $X_\theta\subseteq X$ is a set depending on the parameter $\theta$, and $g:\mathbb R^{k+1} \rightarrow \mathbb R$ is a function.

Very well-known examples are:

- linear scalarization

$$\min_{x\in X} \sum_{i=1}^k w_if_i(x)$$

where the weights of the objectives $w_i>0$ are the parameters of the scalarization.

- $\epsilon$-constraint method (see, e.g.)

$$\begin{array}{ll}
\min & f_j(x)\\
\text{s.t.} & x \in X\\
& f_i(x)\leq \epsilon_i \text{ for }i\in\{1,\ldots,k\}\setminus\{j\}
\end{array}$$

where upper bounds $\epsilon_j$ are parameters as above and $f_j$ is the objective to be minimized.

Somewhat more advanced examples are the following:

- achievement scalarizing problems of Wierzbicki

One example of the achievement scalarizing problems can be formulated as

$$\begin{align}
\min & \max_{i=1,\ldots,k} \left[\frac{f_i(x)-\bar z_i}{z^{nadir}_i-z_i^{utop}}\right] + \rho\sum_{i=1}^k\frac{f_i(x)}{z_i^{nadir}-z_i^{utop}}\\
\text{s.t. } & x\in S
\end{align}$$

where the term $\rho\sum_{i=1}^k\frac{f_i(x)}{z_i^{nadir}-z_i^{utop}}$ is called the augmentation term, $\rho>0$ is a small constant, and $z^{nadir}$ and $z^{utop}$ are the nadir and utopian vectors, respectively. In the above problem, the parameter is the so-called reference point $\bar z$ representing objective function values preferred by the decision maker.

- Sen's multi-objective programming

$$\begin{array}{ll}
\max & \frac{\sum_{j=1}^r  Z_j}{W_j}- \frac{\sum_{j=r+1}^s  Z_j}{W_{r+1}} \\
\text{s.t. } & AX=b \\
& X\geq 0
\end{array}$$

where $W_j$ is individual optima (absolute) for objectives of maximization $r$ and minimization $r+1$ to $s$.

- hypervolume/Chebyshev scalarization

$$\min_{x\in X} \max_i \frac{ f_i(x)}{w_i}$$

where the weights of the objectives $w_i>0$ are the parameters of the scalarization. If the parameters/weights are drawn uniformly in the positive orthant, it is shown that this scalarization provably converges to the Pareto front, even when the front is non-convex.

=== Smooth Chebyshev (Tchebycheff) scalarization ===
The smooth Chebyshev scalarization; also called smooth Tchebycheff scalarisation (STCH); replaces the non-differentiable max-operator of the classical Chebyshev scalarization with a smooth logarithmic soft-max, making standard gradient-based optimization applicable. Unlike typical scalarization methods, it guarantees exploration of the entire Pareto front, convex or concave.

Definition

For a minimization problem with objective functions $f_{1},\dots ,f_{k}$ and the ideal objective vector $z^{\mathrm{ideal}}\in\mathbb{R}^{k}$, the smooth Chebyshev scalarising function is

$g_{u}^{\mathrm{STCH}}\!\bigl(x\mid\boldsymbol{\lambda}\bigr)= u\,\ln\!\Bigl(\sum_{i=1}^{k}\exp\!\bigl(\tfrac{\lambda_{i}\,[\,f_{i}(x)-z^{\mathrm{ideal}}_{i}\,]}{u}\bigr)\Bigr), \qquad u>0,\; \boldsymbol{\lambda}\in\Delta_{k-1},$

where $u$ is the smoothing parameter and $\boldsymbol{\lambda}=(\lambda_{1},\dots ,\lambda_{k})$ is a weight vector on the probability simplex $\Delta_{k-1}$.

As $u\to 0^{+}$ this converges to the classical (non-smooth) Chebyshev form

$g^{\mathrm{TCH}}\!\bigl(x\mid\boldsymbol{\lambda}\bigr)= \max_{i}\lambda_{i}\,[\,f_{i}(x)-z^{\mathrm{ideal}}_{i}\,].$

The parameter $u$ controls the trade-off between differentiability and approximation accuracy: smaller values yield a closer match to the classical Chebyshev scalarisation but reduce the Lipschitz constant of the gradient, while larger values give a smoother surface at the cost of looser approximation.

STCH covers whole Pareto front; convex or concave; because for every preference vector $\boldsymbol{\lambda}\in\Delta$ the minimiser of $g^{\mathrm{STCH}}_{u}(x\mid\boldsymbol{\lambda})$ lands exactly on a Pareto-optimal point.

Properties

- Smoothness and complexity — $g_{u}^{\mathrm{STCH}}$ is continuously differentiable with an $L$-Lipschitz gradient. When every $f_{i}$ is convex the function is convex, and an $\varepsilon$-optimal point is reachable in $\mathcal{O}(1/\varepsilon)$ first-order iterations; sub-gradient descent on $g^{\mathrm{TCH}}$ needs $\mathcal{O}(1/\varepsilon^{2})$ iterations.
- Pareto optimality — For any $u>0$ every minimizer of $g_{u}^{\mathrm{STCH}}(\cdot\mid\boldsymbol{\lambda})$ is weakly Pareto-optimal; if all $\lambda_{i}>0$ (or the minimizer is unique) it is Pareto-optimal.
- Exhaustiveness — There exists a threshold $u^{*}>0$ such that, for $0<u<u^{*}$, every Pareto-optimal point can be obtained as a minimizer of $g_{u}^{\mathrm{STCH}}$ for some weight vector $\boldsymbol{\lambda}$; when the Pareto front is convex this holds for all $u>0$.

For example, portfolio optimization is often conducted in terms of mean-variance analysis. In this context, the efficient set is a subset of the portfolios parametrized by the portfolio mean return $\mu_P$ in the problem of choosing portfolio shares to minimize the portfolio's variance of return $\sigma_P$ subject to a given value of $\mu_P$; see Mutual fund separation theorem for details. Alternatively, the efficient set can be specified by choosing the portfolio shares to maximize the function $\mu_P - b \sigma_P$; the set of efficient portfolios consists of the solutions as $b$ ranges from zero to infinity.

Some of the above scalarizations involve invoking the minimax principle, where always the worst of the different objectives is optimized.

== A posteriori methods ==
A posteriori methods aim at producing all the Pareto optimal solutions or a representative subset of the Pareto optimal solutions. In contrast to a priori methods, the approximation of the Pareto front is generated before the decision maker selects among the alternatives.

=== Overview of methods ===
The principal computational approaches can be broadly grouped according to the optimization principles they employ. The boundaries between these categories are not always strict, and some methods combine ideas from more than one class.

==== Mathematical programming and deterministic methods ====
These methods use mathematical programming, deterministic search, scalarization, continuation, or set-oriented techniques to generate Pareto-optimal solutions or approximations of the Pareto front. The category includes exact methods, such as multi-objective branch-and-bound, as well as methods designed to generate representative approximations of the front. Methods such as NBI, NBIm, NC, and DSD construct families of scalarized subproblems whose repeated solution generates points along the Pareto front.

- Benson's algorithm for multi-objective linear programs, with extensions to convex vector optimization.
- Directed Search Domain (DSD)
- ε-constraint method
- Modified Normal Boundary Intersection (NBIm)
- Multi-objective Branch-and-Bound
- Normal Boundary Intersection (NBI)
- Normal Constraint (NC)
- PGEN (Pareto surface generation for convex multi-objective instances)
- Set-based gradient and Newton methods are deterministic numerical methods that directly optimize a set of solutions representing the Pareto front by maximizing a measure of the quality of the set-based approximation, for example one based on the hypervolume indicator or the averaged Hausdorff distance.
- Successive Pareto Optimization (SPO)

==== Evolutionary multi-criterion optimization ====
Evolutionary multi-criterion optimization (EMO) methods are population-based metaheuristics for optimization problems with multiple objectives. They predominantly follow an a posteriori approach: rather than producing a single solution for a predetermined trade-off between objectives, one run typically seeks an approximation set representing different parts of the Pareto front. The evolving population or an external archive commonly serves as the incumbent approximation of the Pareto front. This ability to generate multiple solutions in one run is a principal advantage of EMO, although Pareto optimality of the resulting approximation generally cannot be guaranteed. Classical book-length references on evolutionary multi-objective optimization include Deb's Multi-Objective Optimization Using Evolutionary Algorithms and Coello Coello, Lamont and Van Veldhuizen's Evolutionary Algorithms for Solving Multi-Objective Problems. EMO methods can be broadly distinguished according to the principle used for selection and for guiding the approximation toward the Pareto front.

===== Pareto-based methods =====
Pareto-based methods use Pareto dominance as the primary selection criterion and a diversity, density, or coverage measure as a secondary criterion.

- NSGA-II (Non-dominated Sorting Genetic Algorithm II), uses non-dominated sorting and crowding distance for selection and diversity maintenance
- SPEA2 (Strength Pareto Evolutionary Algorithm 2), a population-based evolutionary algorithm using Pareto dominance counts for convergence and density estimation for diversity maintenance

===== Indicator-based methods =====
Indicator-based methods use a performance indicator for the quality of a Pareto-front approximation directly in the selection process.

- Approximation-Guided Evolution (AGE), the first algorithm to directly implement and optimize the formal concept of approximation from theoretical computer science
- IBEA (Indicator-Based Evolutionary Algorithm), a general framework in which selection is based on a chosen quality indicator.
- R2-EMOA, which uses R2-indicator-based selection.
- SMS-EMOA (S-metric selection evolutionary multi-objective algorithm). Uses selection based on the hypervolume indicator (S-Metric) of a Pareto front approximation.

===== Decomposition-based methods =====
Decomposition-based methods use a diverse set of weight vectors, reference directions, reference points, or related structures to simultaneously guide solutions toward different regions of the Pareto front.

- Generalized Decomposition approaches
- MOEA/D (Multi-Objective Evolutionary Algorithm based on Decomposition)
- NSGA-III (Non-dominated Sorting Genetic Algorithm III), uses reference points and is designed for many-objective optimization
- GA-PC (Genetic Algorithm with Calibration Variables) introduces auxiliary variables that do not affect the objective functions but help the algorithm escape local optima by breaking symmetries in the search space. This mechanism prevents premature convergence and makes the method particularly suitable for problems with non‑convex Pareto fronts, where decomposition‑based approaches often struggle to maintain diversity and may miss entire regions of the trade‑off surface.

Other evolutionary approaches include multiobjective differential evolution variants and the Subpopulation Algorithm based on Novelty. The latter searches for novel solutions in objective space in addition to non-dominated solutions; novelty search can help guide the search toward previously unexplored regions.

The distinction between Pareto-based, indicator-based, and decomposition-based methods is not exclusive; individual algorithms can combine mechanisms from more than one of these paradigms.

==== Machine-learning-based methods ====
Machine-learning-based methods use learned models either to guide the search for Pareto-optimal solutions or to represent the Pareto set or front. An important subclass uses statistical response-surface models, such as Gaussian process or Kriging models, for computationally expensive objective functions. The modeled objective functions may be deterministic; the statistical model quantifies uncertainty resulting from the limited number of evaluations. Other approaches use the generalization capacity of learned models to approximate an entire Pareto front from a limited number of example trade-offs, a task known as Pareto Front Learning.

- ParEGO uses scalarization together with a Gaussian-process response-surface model and expected improvement for expensive multi-objective optimization.
- Expected Hypervolume Improvement (EHVI) generalizes expected improvement to multicriteria optimization by considering the expected increase in dominated hypervolume relative to the current Pareto-front approximation.
- Pareto-Hypernetworks use learned hypernetworks to represent solutions corresponding to different trade-offs on the Pareto front.
- Multi-objective Stein variational gradient descent uses interacting particles and gradient information to generate diverse solutions along the Pareto front.

==== Other metaheuristic and adaptive methods ====
Some a posteriori methods use swarm intelligence, self-organization, or adaptive search strategies and do not fall uniquely into the categories above.

- IOSO (Indirect Optimization on the basis of Self-Organization)
- Multi-objective particle swarm optimization
- Multi-objective simulated annealing methods have also been developed.
- Reactive Search Optimization (using machine learning for adapting strategies and objectives), implemented in LIONsolver

== Interactive methods ==
In interactive methods of optimizing multiple objective problems, the solution process is iterative and the decision maker continuously interacts with the method when searching for the most preferred solution (see e.g., Miettinen 1999, Miettinen 2008). In other words, the decision maker is expected to express preferences at each iteration to get Pareto optimal solutions that are of interest to the decision maker and learn what kind of solutions are attainable.

The following steps are commonly present in interactive methods of optimization:

1. initialize (e.g., calculate ideal and approximated nadir objective vectors and show them to the decision maker)
2. generate a Pareto optimal starting point (by using e.g., some no-preference method or solution given by the decision maker)
3. ask for preference information from the decision maker (e.g., aspiration levels or number of new solutions to be generated)
4. generate new Pareto optimal solution(s) according to the preferences and show it/them and possibly some other information about the problem to the decision maker
5. if several solutions were generated, ask the decision maker to select the best solution so far
6. stop (if the decision maker wants to; otherwise, go to step 3).

The above aspiration levels refer to desirable objective function values forming a reference point. Instead of mathematical convergence, often used as a stopping criterion in mathematical optimization methods, psychological convergence is often emphasized in interactive methods. Generally speaking, a method is terminated when the decision maker is confident that he/she has found the most preferred solution available.

=== Types of preference information ===
There are different interactive methods involving different types of preference information. Three types can be identified based on

1. trade-off information,
2. reference points, and
3. classification of objective functions.

On the other hand, a fourth type of generating a small sample of solutions is included in: An example of the interactive method utilizing trade-off information is the Zionts-Wallenius method, where the decision maker is shown several objective trade-offs at each iteration, and (s)he is expected to say whether (s)he likes, dislikes, or is indifferent with respect to each trade-off. In reference point-based methods (see e.g.,), the decision maker is expected at each iteration to specify a reference point consisting of desired values for each objective and a corresponding Pareto optimal solution(s) is then computed and shown to them for analysis. In classification-based interactive methods, the decision maker is assumed to give preferences in the form of classifying objectives at the current Pareto optimal solution into different classes, indicating how the values of the objectives should be changed to get a more preferred solution. Then, the classification information is considered when new (more preferred) Pareto optimal solution(s) are computed. In the satisficing trade-off method (STOM), three classes are used: objectives whose values 1) should be improved, 2) can be relaxed, and 3) are acceptable as such. In the NIMBUS method, two additional classes are also used: objectives whose values 4) should be improved until a given bound and 5) can be relaxed until a given bound.

== Hybrid methods ==
Different hybrid methods exist, but here we consider hybridizing MCDM (multi-criteria decision-making) and EMO (evolutionary multi-objective optimization). A hybrid algorithm in multi-objective optimization combines algorithms/approaches from these two fields (see e.g.,). Hybrid algorithms of EMO and MCDM are mainly used to overcome shortcomings by utilizing strengths. Several types of hybrid algorithms have been proposed in the literature, e.g., incorporating MCDM approaches into EMO algorithms as a local search operator, leading a DM to the most preferred solution(s), etc. A local search operator is mainly used to enhance the rate of convergence of EMO algorithms.

The roots for hybrid multi-objective optimization can be traced to the first Dagstuhl seminar organized in November 2004 (see here). Here, some scholars in EMO (Professor Kalyanmoy Deb, Professor Jürgen Branke, etc.) and MCDM (Professor Kaisa Miettinen, Professor Ralph E. Steuer, etc.) realized the potential in combining ideas and approaches of MCDM and EMO fields to prepare hybrids of them. Subsequently, many more Dagstuhl seminars have been arranged to foster collaboration. Recently, hybrid multi-objective optimization has become an important theme in several international conferences in the area of EMO and MCDM (see e.g.,).

== Visualization of the Pareto front ==
Visualization of the Pareto front is one of the a posteriori preference techniques of multi-objective optimization. The a posteriori preference techniques provide an important class of multi-objective optimization techniques. Usually, the a posteriori preference techniques include four steps: (1) computer approximates the Pareto front, i.e., the Pareto optimal set in the objective space; (2) the decision maker studies the Pareto front approximation; (3) the decision maker identifies the preferred point at the Pareto front; (4) computer provides the Pareto optimal decision, whose output coincides with the objective point identified by the decision maker. From the point of view of the decision maker, the second step of the a posteriori preference techniques is the most complicated. There are two main approaches to informing the decision maker. First, a number of points of the Pareto front can be provided in the form of a list (interesting discussion and references are given in) or using heatmaps.

=== Visualization in bi-objective problems: tradeoff curve ===
In the case of bi-objective problems, informing the decision maker concerning the Pareto front is usually carried out by its visualization: the Pareto front, often named the tradeoff curve in this case, can be drawn at the objective plane. The tradeoff curve gives full information on objective values and on objective tradeoffs, which inform how improving one objective is related to deteriorating the second one while moving along the tradeoff curve. The decision maker takes this information into account while specifying the preferred Pareto optimal objective point. The idea to approximate and visualize the Pareto front was introduced for linear bi-objective decision problems by S. Gass and T. Saaty. This idea was developed and applied in environmental problems by J.L. Cohon. A review of methods for approximating the Pareto front for various decision problems with a small number of objectives (mainly, two) is provided in.

=== Visualization in high-order multi-objective optimization problems ===
There are two generic ideas for visualizing the Pareto front in high-order multi-objective decision problems (problems with more than two objectives). One of them, which is applicable in the case of a relatively small number of objective points that represent the Pareto front, is based on using the visualization techniques developed in statistics (various diagrams, etc.; see the corresponding subsection below). The second idea proposes the display of bi-objective cross-sections (slices) of the Pareto front. It was introduced by W.S. Meisel in 1973 who argued that such slices inform the decision maker on objective tradeoffs. The figures that display a series of bi-objective slices of the Pareto front for three-objective problems are known as the decision maps. They give a clear picture of tradeoffs between the three criteria. The disadvantages of such an approach are related to the following two facts. First, the computational procedures for constructing the Pareto front's bi-objective slices are unstable since the Pareto front is usually not stable. Secondly, it is applicable in the case of only three objectives. In the 1980s, the idea of W.S. Meisel was implemented in a different form—in the form of the Interactive Decision Maps (IDM) technique. More recently, N. Wesner proposed using a combination of a Venn diagram and multiple scatterplots of the objective space to explore the Pareto frontier and select optimal solutions.

== See also ==
- Concurrent programming
- Decision-making software
- Goal programming
- Interactive Decision Maps
- Lexicographic max-min optimization
- Leximin order
- Multiple-criteria decision-making
- Multi-objective linear programming
- Multi-disciplinary design optimization
- Pareto efficiency
- Utility function
- Vector optimization
