= Vector optimization =

Vector optimization is a subarea of mathematical optimization where optimization problems with vector-valued objective functions are optimized with respect to a given partial ordering and subject to certain constraints. A multi-objective optimization problem is a special case of a vector optimization problem: The objective space is the finite dimensional Euclidean space partially ordered by the component-wise "less than or equal to" ordering.

== Problem formulation ==
In mathematical terms, a vector optimization problem can be written as:

$$C\operatorname{-}\min_{x \in S} f(x)$$

where $f: X \to Z$ for a partially ordered vector space $Z$. The partial ordering is induced by convex cone $C \subseteq Z$. $X$ is an arbitrary set and $S \subseteq X$ is called the feasible set.

== Solution concepts ==
There are different minimality notions, among them:

- $\bar{x} \in S$ is a weakly efficient point (weak minimizer) if for every $x \in S$ one has $f(x) - f(\bar{x}) \not\in -\operatorname{int} C$.
- $\bar{x} \in S$ is an efficient point (minimizer) if for every $x \in S$ one has $f(x) - f(\bar{x}) \not\in -C \backslash \{0\}$.
- $\bar{x} \in S$ is a properly efficient point (proper minimizer) if $\bar{x}$ is a weakly efficient point with respect to a closed pointed convex cone $\tilde{C}$ where $C \backslash \{0\} \subseteq \operatorname{int} \tilde{C}$.

Every proper minimizer is a minimizer. And every minimizer is a weak minimizer.

Modern solution concepts not only consists of minimality notions but also take into account infimum attainment.

== Solution methods ==
- Benson's algorithm for linear vector optimization problems.

== Relation to multi-objective optimization ==
Any multi-objective optimization problem can be written as

$$\mathbb{R}^d_+\operatorname{-}\min_{x \in M} f(x)$$

where $f: X \to \mathbb{R}^d$ and $\mathbb{R}^d_+$ is the non-negative orthant of $\mathbb{R}^d$. Thus the minimizer of this vector optimization problem are the Pareto efficient points.
