= University of Trento =

Public university in Trento, Italy

- Università degli Studi di Trento
- Other names: UniTn, UniTrento
- Former name: Istituto Universitario Superiore di Scienze Sociali
- Motto: Athesina Studiorum Universitas
- Type: Public university
- Established: 1962
- Academic affiliations: ECIU, EUA, T.I.M.E.
- President: Daniele Finocchiaro
- Rector: Flavio Deflorian
- Faculty: 824
- Students: 16,410
- Location: Trento, Rovereto and San Michele all'Adige, Italy; 46.0694°N 11.1211°E
- Campus: Urban
- Colors: Red
- Sporting affiliations: CUS Trento, UniTrento Sport
- Website: www.unitn.it

The University of Trento (Italian: Università degli Studi di Trento) is an Italian university located in Trento and nearby Rovereto. It has been able to achieve considerable results in didactics, research, computer science and international relations according to CENSIS (Centro Studi Investimenti Sociali) and the Italian Ministry of Education.

== History ==
The University of Trento was founded in 1962 as a Higher University Institute for Social Sciences. It then became the first Faculty of Sociology in Italy. The impact on the city was quite contradictory: the university was seen both as a motivating force for cultural openness and the creation of a new leading class, but also as a fracturing element of protest.

In order to expand the educational opportunities of the University of Trento, in 1972 the Faculty of Science was founded and in 1973 so was the Faculty of Economics. The academic project was expanded in 1984 with the Faculties of Arts and Humanities and Law and in 1985 with the Faculty of Engineering. In 2004 the Faculty of Cognitive Sciences was founded. In 2017 there was the addition of the C3A, Center Agriculture, Food and Environment, with the collaboration of the University of Trento and the Edmund Mach Foundation.

== Departments and centres ==
=== Departments ===
- Cellular, Computational and Integrative Biology - CIBIO
- Civil, Environmental and Mechanical engineering
- Economics and Management
- Faculty of Law
- Humanities
- Industrial engineering
- Information engineering and Computer science
- Mathematics
- Physics
- Psychology and Cognitive science
- Sociology and Social research

=== Centres ===
- C3A - Centre for Agriculture, Food and Environment
- CIMEC – Centre for Mind/Brain Sciences
- CIRM – International Center for Mathematical Research
- SSI – School of International Studies

The didactic and scientific activities are concentrated around three main "areas": the city area, with the Departments of Economics and Management, Sociology and Social research, Humanities, the Faculty of Law and the School of International Studies; the hill area, with the Departments of Civil, Environmental and Mechanical Engineering, Information Engineering and Computer Science, Industrial Engineering, Mathematics, Physics and CIBIO - Centre for Integrative Biology; the Department of Psychology and Cognitive Science and CIMeC - Centre for Mind/Brain Sciences in Rovereto.

== Doctoral schools ==
- Biomolecular Sciences
- Cognitive and Brain Sciences
- Comparative and European legal studies
- Economics and Management (within the School in Social Sciences)
- Engineering of Civil and Mechanical Structural Systems
- Environmental engineering
- Humanities
- Information and Communication Technology
- International Studies
- Local Development and Global Dynamics (within the School in Social Sciences)
- Materials, Mechatronics and Systems Engineering
- Mathematics
- Physics
- Psychological Sciences and Education
- Sociology and Social Research (within the School in Social Sciences)
- Space Science and Technology (national doctorate program)

== Internationalization ==
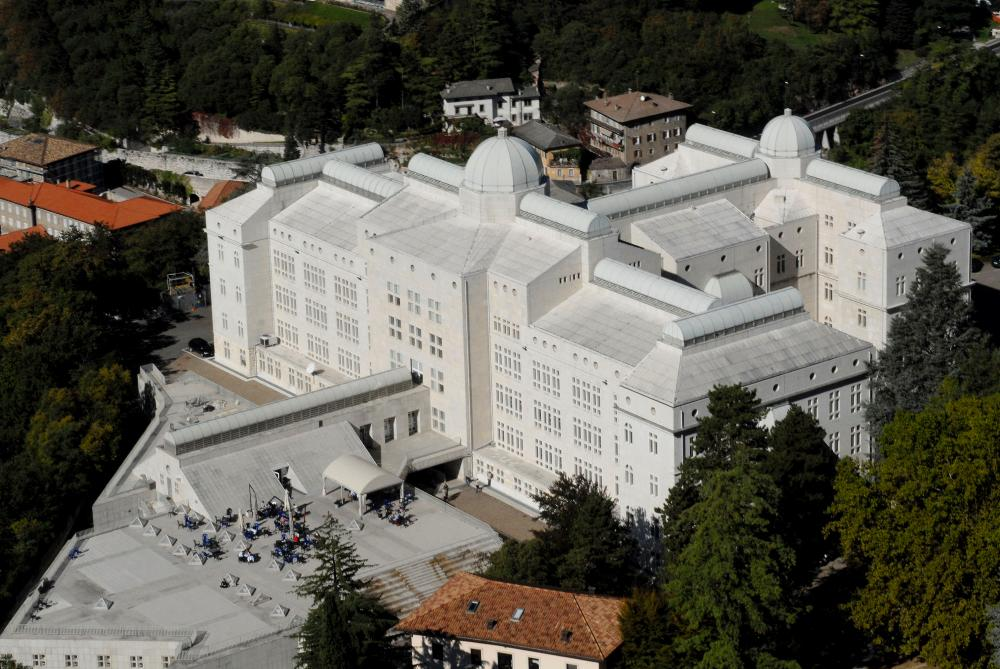
Department of Engineering

Special importance has been given to the International dimension of the university ever since its first years. The university has focused on the development of strategic international alliances in the view of complementarity.

The university has partnerships with prestigious universities and research centers all over the world and is part of important cooperation networks (for instance Consorzio Time, Asea-Uninet GE4).

Aside from the LLP-Erasmus project, since 1997 the university has also supported double degree agreements. The most recent one is the double degree in Civil Engineering with the University of Tongi China (May 2008): students can achieve a Master in Civil Engineering and the two year Master course in Civil Engineering in Trento. The university is part of the Erasmus Mundus programme and the Erasmus Mundus External cooperation window (now called action 2 of Erasmus Mundus II).

The university has a number of bilateral agreements with universities in Asia, America, the Middle East and Oceania. There is collaboration for development co-operation with African and Latin American universities. Foreign Tenured scholars and Visiting professors are 10% of the total number of professors. Collaboration with Germany brought Trento to the Italian seat of the Italian-German University, an institution that deals with coordination for advanced training and research between Italian and German universities.

== Reputation and rankings ==
University rankings

Global – Overall
- QS World: =485 (2026)
- THE World: 198
- THE Young Universities: 37

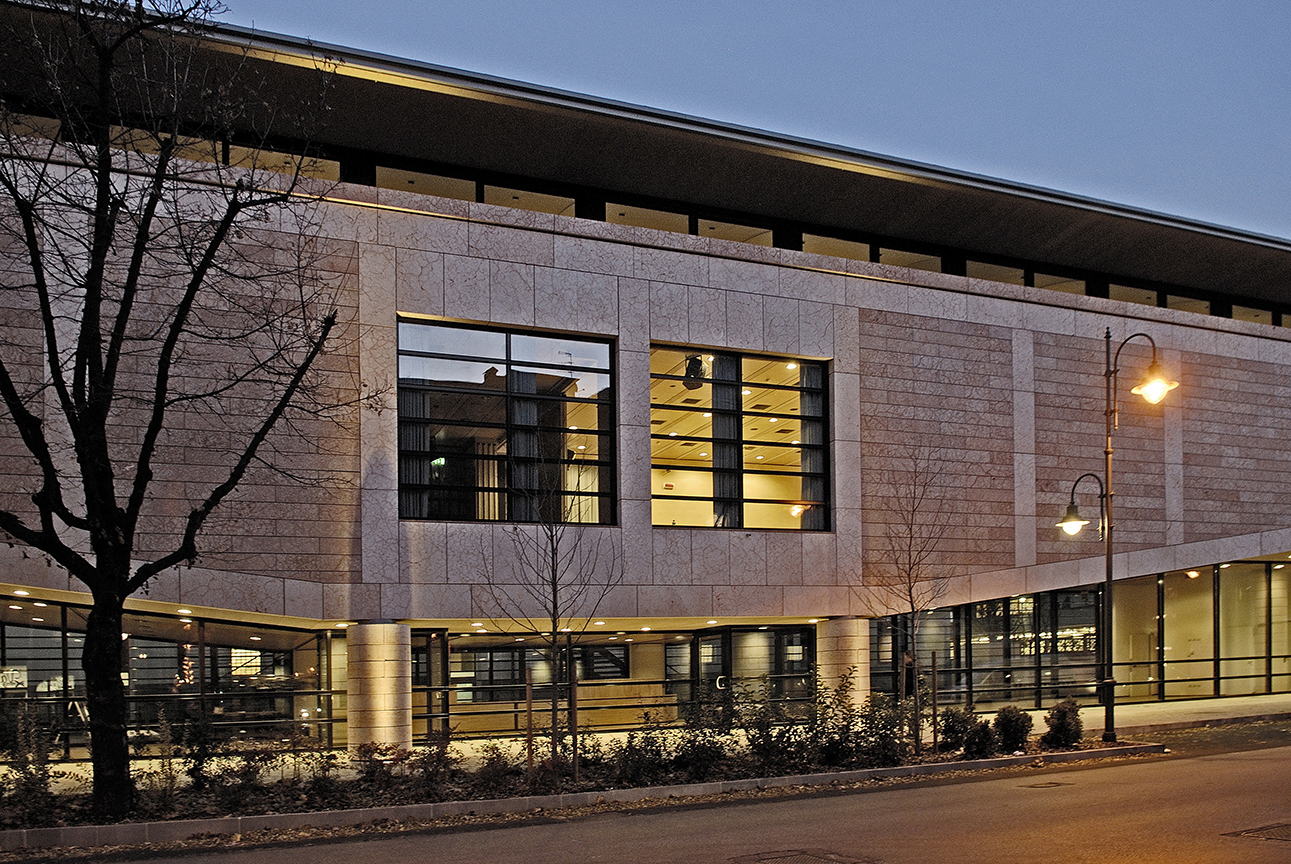
Department of Law, designed by Swiss architect Mario Botta

In 2012, the University of Trento celebrated its first 50 years: a tradition that brings it to be acknowledged as one of the leading universities in Italy, as indicated by several national rankings: the quality of the University of Trento was confirmed by the first national evaluation carried out by MIUR (The Ministry of Education, Universities and Research) and published in the summer of 2009. The University of Trento, according to the ministerial criteria, proved to have reached the best national standards for the quality of its research and teaching. With this result the university earned the title of “the most virtuous university in Italy”.

The 2013 Report by ANVUR (Italian National Agency for the Evaluation of the university system) UniTrento ranks first in the category of scientific production of medium-sized universities.

In the yearly CENSIS results, made in junction with the Grande Guida, and published by La Repubblica, the University of Trento is always in the very first positions. In the last edition (2015-2016) it is confirmed the second place in the mid-size universities (between 10 and 20 thousand students), an improvement of the score from 97,8 to 99,8.

By the last Sole 24 Ore ranking of the best Italian State Universities, the University of Trento is the second.

In the 2015-2016 Times Higher Education World University Rankings, the University of Trento placed #198 in the world.

In the Best University Under 50 Years Old by Times Higher Education World University Ranking, the University of Trento was ranked #37 in the world.

The Department of Computer Science of Trento U was ranked top 50 in Europe through Microsoft Academic Ranking, and was placed #92 in the world by Times Higher Education World University Ranking 2020.

University of Trento and Microsoft Research open in Trento "The Centre for Computational and Systems Biology" (COSBI). The University of Trento has been increasing the number of courses available in English in parallel with its increased internationalization.

== Services ==
In collaboration with the Opera Universitaria, Trento University offers 1500 accommodations in the San Bartolameo Campus, in student residences or flats that have special agreements with the university. The university has a central library composed of different buildings (in each Faculty) where students can consult books or borrow them, study or use the internet, with long opening hours (even until midnight), open Saturday and Sunday. With the Welcome Office, the university supports International students and researchers in the administrative procedures connected with their arrival and stay in Trento (entry visa, residence permit, health insurance, accommodation, National insurance number, etc.) and gives information as regards the modalities and documentation needed to enroll. Thanks to the Opera Universitaria, the university is able to offer students grants. Starting from academic year 2008/2009, the university radically changed its university fees system, emphasizing merit and students' efforts. Those who enroll have the chance to apply for grants up to €4000. The latest project born at the University of Trento is UNI.sport,

the new university network for sports services and facilities dedicated to the students of Trento University.

== Collegio Clesio ==
The University of Trento, in collaboration with Opera Universitaria and the Bank of Trento and Rovereto, opened the "collegio" in October 2010. Every year a few highly selected undergraduate and postgraduate students are admitted to the excellence facility. The admission process consists firstly in an evaluation of the curriculum of the student, then in a written test and, eventually, in a personal interview. Once admitted, the students have to:

- get at least 51 CFU (equivalent to ECTS credits) per year;
- maintain a high average of their exams' marks;
- participate actively to the cultural program proposed year by year by the "collegio".

Throughout the bachelor or master period, it is furthermore required to spend at least a three-months' period abroad (taking part to an Erasmus+ project or a Bilateral Agreement for instance).

== University Library System ==
The library was created in 1962 initially as a facility to support the teaching and research activities of the Istituto Superiore di Scienze Sociali (Advanced institute of social sciences) which turned into the first Faculty of Sociology in Italy, in 1972. The system then developed following the evolution of the university, in particular in 1972, with the creation of the Faculty of Sciences, in 1973, with the opening of Economics and in 1984 and 1985 with creation respectively of the Faculty of Humanities, Law and Engineering. The library has been a member of the Bibliographic Catalogue of Trentino since 1984 thus making it possible to search its contents online. Later on the Library was included in the Trentino Library System and it became a highly specialized bibliographic and cultural centre, which is accessible not only for students and teachers of the university, but also for all citizens.

The Biblioteca Universitaria Centrale, is a newly built University library, designed by Renzo Piano. The building is divided into seven floors, distributed in four annexes. Most of the books are placed on open shelves in fifteen rooms.

=== Mission ===
The University Library System aims at:

- acquiring, cataloguing, accessing, updating and storing the bibliographic heritage of the University of Trento
- the development library, documentary and ITC services to support teaching and research activities
- the continuous widening of technologically advanced systems to access and use the bibliographic information online
- the subscription and participation in the regional, national and international coordination bodies, with other universities, library systems, research institutes, consortia and institutes

=== Contents (last update 1 January 2013) ===
- No. of dissertations 1.944
- No. of volumes 448.808
- No. of magazines 2.718
- No. of paper on-going and interrupted magazines 12.078
- No. of on-going e-magazines 8.496
- No. of on-going and interrupted e-magazines 10.947
- No. of databases 130
- No. of e-books 3.589

The collections of sociology, ancient law books and Slave studies are particularly important.

== Rectors ==
- 1962 – 1968 Mario Volpato
- 1968 – 1970 Francesco Alberoni
- 1970 – 1970 Norberto Bobbio
- 1970 – 1972 Guido Baglioni
- 1972 – 1978 Paolo Prodi
- 1977 – 1978 Ezio Clementel
- 1978 – 1990 Fabio Ferrari
- 1990 – 1996 Fulvio Zuelli
- 1996 – 2004 Massimo Egidi
- 2004 – 2013 Davide Bassi
- 2013 – 2014 Daria de Pretis
- 2015 − 2021 Paolo Collini
- 2021 − today Flavio Deflorian

== Honorary professors ==
- Achille Varzi (philosopher)
- Imrich Chlamtac
- Jean-Paul Fitoussi
- Mikhail Gorbačëv, ex President of the Soviet Union
- Tenzin Gyatso, born Lhamo Dondrub, XIV Dalai Lama
- Václav Klaus, President of the Czech Republic
- Giorgio Napolitano, President of the Italian Republic, awarded 11 February 2008

== Notable alumni ==
- Francesca Gino, Italian-American behavioral scientist

== Honorary degrees ==
Awarded to	Degree	Awarded on
John Cole	Anthropology	14.10.2002
Reinhard Elze	Law	08.03.1995
Rudolf B. Schlesinger	Law	08.03.1995
Monsignor Iginio Rogger	Law	12.04.2006
Rory Byrne	Materials Engineering	05.05.2005
Andrea Zanzotto	Arts and Humanities	21.11.1995
Paul Charles Cristophe Claval	Arts and Humanities	08.03.1995
Giulio Einaudi	Arts and Humanities	11.12.1997
Jean Rousset	Foreign languages and Literature	21.11.1995
Carlo Alberto Mastrelli	Foreign languages and Literature	11.12.1997
Isabel Allende	Modern European-American Languages and Literature	15.05.2007
Daniel Kahnemann	Psychology and Mathematics	14.10.2002
Ermanno Gorrieri	Sociology	08.03.1999
Tina Anselmi	Sociology	30.03.2004
Maurizio Cattelan	Sociology	30.03.2004
Sergio Marchionne	Mechatronics Engineering	02.10.2017

== See also ==
- List of Italian universities
- Wilmagate
