= Guess value =

In mathematical modeling, a guess value is more commonly called a starting value or initial value. These are necessary for most optimization problems which use search algorithms, because those algorithms are mainly deterministic and iterative, and they need to start somewhere. One common type of application is nonlinear regression.

== Use ==
The quality of the initial values can have a considerable impact on the success or lack of such of the search algorithm. This is because the fitness function or objective function (in many cases a sum of squared errors (SSE)) can have difficult shapes. In some parts of the search region, the function may increase exponentially, in others quadratically, and there may be regions where the function asymptotes to a plateau. Starting values that fall in an exponential region can lead to algorithm failure because of arithmetic overflow. Starting values that fall in the asymptotic plateau region can lead to algorithm failure because of "dithering". Deterministic search algorithms may use a slope function to go to a minimum. If the slope is very small, then underflow errors can cause the algorithm to wander, seemingly aimlessly; this is dithering.

== Finding value ==
Guess values can be determined a number of ways. Guessing is one of them. If one is familiar with the type of problem, then this is an educated guess or guesstimate. Other techniques include linearization, solving simultaneous equations, reducing dimensions, treating the problem as a time series, converting the problem to a (hopefully) linear differential equation, and using mean values. Further methods for determining starting values and optimal values in their own right come from stochastic methods, the most commonly known of these being evolutionary algorithms and particularly genetic algorithms.
