= Truncate selection =

Truncate selection may refer to:

- Truncation selection
- Non-random sampling
