= ECJ (disambiguation) =

ECJ is the European Court of Justice, the highest court in the European Union in matters of European Union law.

ECJ may also refer to:

== Computing ==
- Java Evolutionary Computation Toolkit, a Java-based evolutionary Computation Research System
- Eclipse Compiler for Java, a Java compiler in the Eclipse framework

== Other uses ==
- Eclipse ECJ, a very light jet produced by Eclipse Aviation
- Escuela Complementaria Japonesa de Madrid, a Japanese international school in Madrid
- Evolutionary Computation Journal, a scientific journal on evolutionary computation

== See also ==
- Court of Justice of the European Union (CJEU), the full court system of the European Union
