= Pors =

Pors may refer to

- PORS, the Plus-One-Recall-Store language used in evolutionary computation and genetic programming
- Pors Fotball, also known as Pors Grenland, or just Pors, a Norwegian football club
