= Cartesian genetic programming =

Cartesian genetic programming is a form of genetic programming that uses a graph representation to encode computer programs. It grew from a method of evolving digital circuits developed by Julian F. Miller and Peter Thomson in 1997. The term 'Cartesian genetic programming' first appeared in 1999 and was proposed as a general form of genetic programming in 2000. It is called ‘Cartesian’ because it represents a program using a two-dimensional grid of nodes.

Miller's keynote explains how CGP works. He edited a book entitled Cartesian Genetic Programming, published in 2011 by Springer.

The open source project dCGP implements a differentiable version of CGP developed at the European Space Agency by Dario Izzo, Francesco Biscani and Alessio Mereta able to approach symbolic regression tasks, to find solution to differential equations, find prime integrals of dynamical systems, represent variable topology artificial neural networks and more.

== See also ==
- Genetic programming
- Gene expression programming
- Grammatical evolution
- Linear genetic programming
- Multi expression programming
