= 3AC =

3AC may refer to:

- Toyota A engine
- Three-address code
- Three-phase electric power
- Three Arrows Capital, a defunct cryptocurrency hedge fund
