= LGP =

LGP may refer to:

- Bicol International Airport IATA code
- Last Glacial Period, the most recent period of Earth glaciation
- Leandro González Pírez, an Argentine professional footballer
- Leonard Green & Partners, an American private equity firm
- Light guide plate, a type of diffuser used in liquid-crystal displays
- Linear genetic programming, type of genetic programming algorithm
- Linux Game Publishing, an English game developing company
- Portuguese Sign Language
- London Green Party
