= PORS =

Plus-One-Recall-Store (PORS) is a language used in evolutionary computation and genetic programming.

The PORS language consists of two terminal nodes (1 and recall), one unary operation (store), and one binary operation (plus) that be used in a parse tree to do a calculation.
