= Stochastic universal sampling =

Data sampling technique used in genetic algorithm

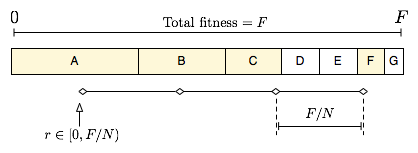
SUS example

Stochastic universal sampling (SUS) is a selection technique used in evolutionary algorithms for selecting potentially useful solutions for recombination. It was introduced by James Baker.

SUS is a development of fitness proportionate selection (FPS) which exhibits no bias and minimal spread. Where FPS chooses several solutions from the population by repeated random sampling, SUS uses a single random value to sample all of the solutions by choosing them at evenly spaced intervals. This gives weaker members of the population (according to their fitness) a chance to be chosen.

FPS can have bad performance when a member of the population has a really large fitness in comparison with other members. Using a comb-like ruler, SUS starts from a small random number, and chooses the next candidates from the rest of population remaining, not allowing the fittest members to saturate the candidate space.

== Pseudo Code ==
Described as an algorithm, pseudocode for SUS looks like:

SUS(Population, N)
    F := total fitness of Population
    N := number of offspring to keep
    P := distance between the pointers (F/N)
    Start := random number between 0 and P
    Pointers := [Start + i*P | i in [0..(N-1)]]
    return RWS(Population,Pointers)

RWS(Population, Points)
    Keep = []
    for P in Points
        I := 0
        while fitness sum of Population[0..I] < P
            I++
        add Population[I] to Keep
    return Keep

Where Population[0..I] is the set of individuals with array-index 0 to (and including) I.

Here RWS() describes the bulk of fitness proportionate selection (also known as "roulette wheel selection") – in true fitness proportional selection the parameter Points is always a (sorted) list of random numbers from 0 to F. The algorithm above is intended to be illustrative rather than canonical.

== See also ==
- Fitness proportionate selection
- Reward-based selection
