= Paradiseo =

- Developer: DOLPHIN project-team of INRIA
- Stable release: 3.0.0 / February 10, 2023
- Repository: github.com/nojhan/paradiseo
- Written in: C++
- Operating system: Cross-platform
- Type: Technical computing
- License: CeCILL license
- Website: nojhan.github.io/paradiseo/

ParadisEO is an object-oriented framework dedicated to the flexible design of metaheuristics. It uses EO, a template-based, ANSI-C++ compliant computation library. ParadisEO is portable across both Windows system and sequential platforms (Unix, Linux, Mac OS X, etc.). ParadisEO is distributed under the CeCill license and can be used under several environments.

== See also ==
- Java Evolutionary Computation Toolkit, a toolkit to implement Evolutionary Algorithms
- MOEA Framework, an open source Java framework for multiobjective evolutionary algorithms
