= Truncation selection =

Method of selection in selective breeding

Truncation selection is a selection method in selective breeding and in evolutionary algorithms from computer science, which selects a certain share of fittest individuals from a population for reproduction in the next generation.

== Animal and plant breeding ==
In animal and plant breeding, truncation selection is a standard method. Animals are ranked by their phenotypic value on some trait such as milk production, and the top percentage is reproduced. The effects of truncation selection for a continuous trait can be modeled by the standard breeder's equation by using heritability and truncated normal distributions. On a binary trait, it can be modeled easily using the liability threshold model. It is considered an easy and efficient method of breeding.

== Computer science ==
In computer science, truncation selection is a selection method used in evolutionary algorithms to select potential candidate solutions for recombination modeled after the breeding method. In truncation selection the candidate solutions are ordered by fitness, and some proportion T% of the top fittest individuals are selected and reproduced randomly. It is used in Muhlenbein's breeder genetic algorithm.
