= ACM SIGEVO =

Professional special interest group on genetic and evolutionary computation

- ACM Special Interest Group on Genetic and Evolutionary Computation
- Predecessor: ISGEC
- Formation: 2005; 21 years ago
- Type: Professional organization
- Headquarters: ACM
- Location: New York City, USA
- Region served: International
- Services: Conferences; Journals; Awards; Grants; Newsletter; Networking
- Chair: Peter Bosnan
- Vice-Chair: Emma Hart
- Main organ: Newsletter
- Publication: ACM Transactions on Evolutionary Learning and Optimization
- Parent organization: ACM
- Website: Official website

The ACM SIGEVO is a Special Interest Group of the Association of Computing Machinery for members of that organization who are practitioners, academics, students or others with interests in evolutionary computation and related algorithms.

== History ==
ACM SIGEVO was founded in 2005 when the International Society for Genetic and Evolutionary Computation (ISGEC) became an ACM Special Interest Group under its present title. The ISGEC had been formed in 1999 by the merger of the Genetic Programming conference organization with the International Conference on Genetic Algorithms (ICGA) leading to the first Genetic and Evolutionary Computation Conference (GECCO).

== Membership ==
Members of this SIG pay a small fee in addition to the ACM membership fee. In return they have access to a quarterly online newsletter, but more importantly can obtain reduced registration rates at the two conferences organised by ACM SIGEVO: GECCO and the Foundations of Genetic Algorithms conference (FOGA).

They can also access material on evolutionary computation and related topics in the ACM Digital Library. In addition they can subscribe to email mailing lists in order to keep informed about news over time.

For students, ACM SIGEVO sponsors Travel Awards for attendance at the GECCO Conference and FOGA (the Foundations of Genetic Algorithms conference). ACM SIGEVO also sponsors a Graduate Student Workshop. ACM also sponsors Awards to be competed for by attendees at the conferences it organises.

== Conferences ==
ACM SIGEVO organises two major conferences in the field of evolutionary computation. The Genetic and Evolutionary Conference (GECCO) is held annually, while the Foundations of Genetic Algorithms conference (FOGA) is held biennially.

=== GECCO ===
The first GECCO conference was held prior to the formation of ACM SIGEVO but since 2005 (see History above) it has been organised annually by ACM SIGEVO. The latest (2025) was held in Málaga, Spain. The next (2026) will be held in San José, Costa Rica.

=== FOGA ===
Foundations of Genetic Algorithms (FOGA)
- Status: Active
- Genre: Conference
- Frequency: Biennial
- Years active: 35
- Inaugurated: 1990
- Most recent: 2025
- Next event: 2027
- Area: International
- Major events: Evolutionary computation Theoretical computer science
- Sponsor: Association for Computing Machinery; SIGEVO

Foundations of Genetic Algorithms (FOGA) is a biennial peer-reviewed research conference focusing on the theoretical principles underlying genetic algorithms, other evolutionary algorithms and related heuristics. It is organized by ACM SIGEVO. Its relevance to the computer science research community has been reflected in an A-rating in the CORE computer science conference assessment system.

The Foundations of Genetic Algorithms (FOGA) conference originated as a workshop in 1990 in order to create an opportunity for researchers on genetic algorithms and related areas of evolutionary computation to focus on the theoretical principles underlying their field. From the start its multi-day duration made it comparable to conferences in the field, and since 2015 its proceedings have used conference rather than workshop in their titles.

In 2005 ACM SIGEVO the Association for Computing Machinery Special Interest Group on Genetic and Evolutionary Computation was formed and every FOGA conference since then has been supported by SIGEVO. The table below shows FOGA conferences by year, location, websites (where available) and publisher of proceedings. A citation follows the reference to the publisher giving the full details of each FOGA proceedings.

Papers accepted at recent conferences have been presented as digital or print posters in poster sessions at the conference, before being published in written form in the conference proceedings.

FOGA is comparable in its multi-day duration to other conferences on evolutionary computation such as CEC, GECCO and PPSN. The main difference is that FOGA focuses on the theoretical basis of evolutionary computation and related subjects. While the above conferences devote some time to theory they also cover a wide range of other topics including competitions and applications. This focus on theoretical computer science was reflected in the CORE computer science conference assessment exercise, where FOGA was given an A-ranking in the 2023 assessment. GECCO and PPSN also obtained A-rankings, but many other conferences in the field of evolutionary computation obtained lower rankings. This suggests that FOGA is a relevant conference in its field, comparable with others including the much larger CEC or GECCO.

Foundations of Genetic Algorithms (FOGA) conferences
Year	Location	Website	Publisher
1990	Bloomington	No	Morgan Kaufmann
1992	Vail	No	Morgan Kaufmann
1994	Estes Park	No	Morgan Kaufmann
1996	San Diego	No	Morgan Kaufmann
1998	Amsterdam	No	Morgan Kaufmann
2000	Charlottesville	No	Morgan Kaufmann
2002	Torremolinos	No	Morgan Kaufmann
2005	Aizuwakamatsu	No	Springer
2007	Mexico City	Yes	Springer
2009	Orlando	Yes	ACM
2011	Schwarzenberg	Yes	ACM
2013	Adelaide	Yes	ACM
2015	Aberystwyth	No	ACM
2017	Copenhagen	No	ACM
2019	Potsdam	No	ACM
2021	Dornbirn	No	ACM
2023	Potsdam	Yes	ACM
2025	Leiden	Yes	ACM

Keynote speakers at past conferences have been:

Keynote speakers at FOGA conferences
Year	Keynote speakers
2021	Adi Livnat & Tim Roughgarden
2023	Carola Doerr & José A. Lozano
2025	Joshua D. Knowles, Vedran Dunjko & Tobias Glasmachers

== Awards ==
ACM SIGEVO sponsors a number of awards.

=== SIGEVO Outstanding Contribution Award ===
The SIGEVO Outstanding Contribution Award commenced in 2023, and these awards are designed to recognise distinctive contributions to the field of evolutionary computation when evaluated over a period of at least 15 years. As a result, many recipients to date are notable academics or industrial practitioners, and include Anne Auger, Kalyanmoy Deb, Stephanie Forrest, Emma Hart and Hans-Paul Schwefel.

=== SIGEVO Dissertation Award ===
The SIGEVO Dissertation Award recognises thesis research in the field of evolutionary computation completed at least by the year prior to a GECCO conference. Theses are submitted and reviewed by a panel that selects one winner and a maximum of two honourable mentions. Awards will be made to the winner and any others at the next GECCO conference.

=== SIGEVO Chair Award ===
The SIGEVO Chair Award, established in 2016 is a lecture sponsored by ACM SIGEVO, to take place on the last day of the GECCO conference. It recognizes through the lectures that the lecturers are influential researchers in the field of evolutionary computation. The more recent lectures are available online. The 2024 Award winner was Una-May O'Reilly.

=== SIGEVO Impact Award ===
The SIGEVO Impact Award looks back to the GECCO conference ten years earlier and recognizes up to three papers a year which are considered by the current ACM SIGEVO Executive Committee to have had significant impact over the period since their first publication at the GECCO conference. An example (originally published in GECCO 2010) received this award in 2020.

=== GECCO Best Paper Award ===
The ACM SIGEVO sponsors awards for the best papers presented at the GECCO conference. Because GECCO conferences have very many parallel tracks there are multiple awards recognising presentations in the different tracks. At GECCO 2025 Best Paper Awards were presented across 12 tracks.

=== FOGA Best Paper Award ===
The ACM SIGEVO sponsors awards for the best papers presented at the FOGA conference. Because FOGA operates on a single track, it is easier to compare papers. Since 2019 this Award has been made (suggesting only four awards up to the latest conference in 2025). ACM SIGEVO records the 2019 award.

=== Humie Award ===
The Humies Awards are rewards for the best form of human-competitive results using evolutionary computation or related algorithms and published in the wider literature (they do not need to be published at a conference or in a journal sponsored by ACM SIGEVO or even the ACM.) They were established through a gift from John Koza and have been in operation from 2004 to the present. The link with ACM SIGEVO is that the winners of the competition (submissions are evaluated in advance) are presented with Humie Awards at GECCO conferences. The Humie Awards website provides full details for the rules and how to submit entries to the competition.

== Journals ==
ACM SIGEVO sponsors the main journal covering evolutionary computation published by the ACM: ACM Transactions on Evolutionary Learning and Optimization.

ACM SIGEVO refers to the preceding ISGEC organisation (see History above) as sponsoring two other important journals in the field:

- The Evolutionary Computation journal.
- Genetic Programming and Evolvable Machines.

While these journals continue to be important in the field, the wording on the website of ACM SIGEVO suggests that ACM SIGEVO is not involved in their publication.
