= Riccardo Poli =

Italian computer scientist and professor

Riccardo Poli (born 1961) is a Professor in the Department of Computing and Electronic Systems of the University of Essex. His work has centered on genetic programming.

== Education ==
Poli started his academic career with a Laurea in electronic engineering from the University of Florence in 1989. He then did a PhD in biomedical image analysis (1993) at the same university. He later became an expert in the field of evolutionary computation, working as a Lecturer and then a Reader at the University of Birmingham from 1994 until 2001, when he moved to Essex as a professor. Poli has published around 240 refereed papers and two books (Langdon and Poli, 2002; Poli, Langdon, McPhee, 2008) on the theory and applications of genetic programming, evolutionary algorithms, particle swarm optimisation, biomedical engineering, brain–computer interfaces, neural networks, image analysis, signal processing, biology and psychology.

He is a member of the EPSRC Peer Review College, an EU expert evaluator and a grant-proposal referee for Irish, Swiss and Italian funding bodies.

== Genetic Programming ==
He is a Fellow of the International Society for Genetic and Evolutionary Computation and a recipient of the EvoStar award for outstanding contributions to this field (2007). He was an ACM SIGEVO executive board member until 2013. He was co-founder and co-chair of the European Conference on GP (EuroGP) (1998–2000, 2003). He was general chair (2004), track chair (2002, 2007), business committee member (2005), and competition chair (2006) of ACM’s Genetic and Evolutionary Computation Conference, co-chair of the Foundations of Genetic Algorithms Workshop (FOGA) (2002) and technical chair of the International Workshop on Ant Colony Optimisation and Swarm Intelligence (2006).

Poli is an associate editor of Genetic Programming and Evolvable Machines, Evolutionary Computation and the International Journal of Computational Intelligence Research. He is an advisory board member of the Journal on Artificial Evolution and Applications and an editorial board member of Swarm Intelligence.

Poli co-wrote Foundations of Genetic Programming and A Field Guide to Genetic Programming. A book review in Genetic Programming and Evolvable Machines noted that the latter book was unusual because it had been published under a Creative Commons license.
