= IEEE Congress on Evolutionary Computation =

Conference on evolutionary computation

- Abbreviation: IEEE CEC
- Discipline: Evolutionary computation

Publication details
- Publisher: IEEE Computational Intelligence Society
- History: 1994-present
- Frequency: Annual

The IEEE Congress on Evolutionary Computation is a research conference for practitioners in the field of evolutionary computation, interpreted broadly, organised by the IEEE Computational Intelligence Society. It has been held annually since 1994, although its current name was only adopted in 1999. In alternate years it combines with the other main conferences organised by the IEEE Computational Intelligence Society in the IEEE World Congress on Computational Intelligence (IEEE WCCI).

== Origin and naming ==
IEEE CEC began in 1994 as the IEEE Conference on Evolutionary Computation. In 1995 the conference name changed to the IEEE International Conference on Evolutionary Computation (IEEE ICEC) and it was held with this title through 1998. In 1999, the IEEE Computational Intelligence Society, in combination with the Evolutionary Programming Society which operated the annual Evolutionary Programming Conference (1992–1999) and the IET which operated the International Conference on Genetic Algorithms in Engineering Systems, Innovations and Applications (1995–1999) through the IEE, combined to co-sponsor the newly named IEEE Congress on Evolutionary Computation, and this title continues to the present.

In even-numbered years it is part of the IEEE World Congress on Computational Intelligence (IEEE WCCI), which combines all the main conferences of the IEEE Computational Intelligence Society: IEEE CEC, IJCNN (the International Joint Conference on Neural Networks) and FUZZ-IEEE (the IEEE International Conference on Fuzzy Systems).

== History ==
Since the first conference in 1994 the conference has been held annually at different international locations reflecting global involvement in the field of evolutionary computation.

IEEE CEC conferences over time
Year	Location	Website	Proceedings
1994	Orlando, United States	No	Yes
1995	Perth, Australia	No	Yes
1996	Nagoya, Japan	No	Yes
1997	Indianapolis, United States	No	Yes
1998	Anchorage, United States	No	Yes
1999	Washington, D.C., United States	Yes	Yes
2000	San Diego, United States	No	Yes
2001	Seoul, South Korea	No	Yes
2002	Honolulu, United States	No	Yes
2003	Canberra, Australia	No	Yes
2004	Portland, United States	No	Yes
2005	Edinburgh, United Kingdom	Yes	Yes
2006	Vancouver, Canada	Yes	Yes
2007	Singapore	Yes	Yes
2008	Hong Kong, China	Yes	Yes
2009	Trondheim, Norway	No	Yes
2010	Barcelona, Spain	No	Yes
2011	New Orleans, United States	Yes	Yes
2012	Brisbane, Australia	No	Yes
2013	Cancún, Mexico	No	Yes
2014	Beijing, China	Yes	Yes
2015	Sendai, Japan	No	Yes
2016	Vancouver, Canada	Yes	Yes
2017	San Sebastián, Spain	No	Yes
2018	Rio de Janeiro, Brazil	No	Yes
2019	Wellington, New Zealand	No	Yes
2020	Glasgow, United Kingdom	No	Yes
2021	Kraków, Poland	No	Yes
2022	Padua, Italy	No	Yes
2023	Chicago, United States	Yes	Yes
2024	Yokohama, Japan	Yes	Yes
2025	Hangzhou, China	No	Yes
2026	Maastricht, Netherlands	Yes	Forthcoming

== Main conference ==
=== Themes ===
The main part of each IEEE CEC conference is a series of sessions covering most fields of evolutionary computation, its applications and related areas with similar inspiration from biology. Because there are a large number of sessions much of the conference is organised in parallel: the one page diagram of the program of IEEE CEC 2023 makes this clear.

To emphasize this, the table below lists sessions from the program of IEEE CEC 2011 together with comments. Although 2011 is now some time ago (this article was updated in 2025) that year was selected because the detailed program was available as a separate document that can be downloaded and read separately from the conference proceedings.

Sessions at IEEE CEC 2011
Topic	Comments
The artificial bee colony algorithm	Applications inspired by the behaviour of bees
Real world applications	Multiple sessions about applications of evolutionary algorithms and related techniques not covered by other sessions
Evolutionary robotics	The application of evolutionary algorithms to control of robots
Evolutionary strategies	The evolution strategy is one of the original paradigms of evolutionary computation
Evolutionary computation applied to finance	Fintech is an important field to which evolutionary computation can contribute
Hardware aspects of biologically inspired systems	Evolutionary computation usually focuses on software. What about the hardware needed to run it?
Computer vision	Evolutionary computation applied to image analysis
Applications in bioinformatics and computational biology	Much of computational biology is concerned with the software tools needed for bioinformatics, so these application domains overlap
Evolutionary computation applied to large-scale problems using multi-core architectures.	In 2025 laptops have multi-core CPUs: in 2011 this referred to GPUs
Clustering and data mining	Machine learning techniques applied to data science can also use evolutionary computation
Evolvable hardware and software	Using, for example, field programmable gate arrays
Fitness landscapes and learning	evolutionary algorithms depend on an idea of fitness and this affects their application
Computational intelligence and games	Applications both in game theory and in specific games
Nature-inspired constrained optimization	Applications of evolutionary computation to this type of optimization
Approaches to Large-scale optimization problems	How can evolutionary computation be useful?
The ant colony algorithm applied to complex problems	This algorithm is inspired by the behaviour of ants in nature
Art and music	How can evolutionary computation be applied in these creative disciplines?
Genetic programming	One of the classic algorithms of evolutionary computation
Memetic algorithms	Another direction of research in evolutionary algorithms
Cultural algorithms and artificial immune systems	Applications inspired by complex systems in cultural interactions and in the biological immune system
Evolution of developmental systems	Algorithms inspired by developmental biology
Metaheuristics for global continuous optimization	Applications of evolutionary algorithms as heuristics to this branch of optimization
Representation and operators	How to represent a real-world problem in an evolutionary algorithm in order to get useful solutions
Learning classifier systems	Combining an evolutionary algorithm with some other machine learning component
Multi-objective optimization	Evolutionary computation applied to another area of optimization
Learning in autonomous agents	Application of evolutionary computation in this field of artificial intelligence
Statistical techniques in evolutionary algorithms	The use of statistical inference can affect applications of evolutionary algorithms
Particle swarm optimization	More biologically inspired algorithms often associated with evolutionary computation
Medical image analysis	Applying evolutionary computation to this specific domain
Evolutionary programming	Another of the early algorithms that formed evolutionary computation
Differential evolution	Another type of evolutionary algorithm
Evolved neural networks	Neural networks are a major distinct field of activity in computer science, but evolutionary computation can introduce change
Theory of evolutionary computation	What are the mathematical bases of evolutionary algorithms?
Engineering applications of evolutionary computation	A session focusing on another application domain
Complex networks	Complex networks may be addressed through applications of evolutionary computation
Multi-agent systems	Applications of evolutionary computation to the understanding of multi-agent systems
Network optimization	Real-world network design generates optimization problems that may be addressed through application of evolutionary computation
Coevolution in evolutionary computation	Drawing inspiration from biological coevolution can lead to innovation in evolutionary computation
Artificial life	Drawing inspiration from wider areas of biology, in addition to evolutionary biology

=== Plenary speakers ===
Researchers recognized in the field are invited to give plenary speeches at each IEEE CEC conference. At IEEE CEC 2023 in Chicago the plenary speakers were Stephanie Forrest, Markus Olhofer and Kalyanmoy Deb. Stephanie Forrest was the recipient of the Pioneer Award at that conference.

=== Awards ===
The Pioneer Award mentioned in plenary speakers above is awarded at IEEE CEC conferences to an individual who is recognized in having made a substantial contribution to the field of evolutionary computation.

In addition, awards are presented to the winners of the competitions, and to presenters of papers selected as the Best Papers.

== Additional sessions ==
=== Tutorials ===
Because the main sessions of each IEEE CEC conference covers so many different fields, tutorials are held in addition to the main conference that allow participants to learn about areas that they may not have been familiar with before. Examples of tutorials at IEEE CEC 2023 are given in the table below.

Tutorials at IEEE CEC 2023
Tutorial title	Comments
Genetic programming and machine learning for scheduling	Scheduling is an important application domain in many areas
Transfer learning in evolutionary spaces	Transfer learning, a machine learning technique that originated separately from evolutionary computation can follow new directions in the latter field
Benchmarking and analyzing iterative optimization heuristics with IOH profiler	Benchmarking is as important in evolutionary computation as it is in other areas of computer science, since many similar algorithms can be developed
Evolutionary computation success in medical diagnosis	A tutorial on a specific application domain.

=== Workshops ===
Although the main IEEE CEC conference does cover a very wide range of different fields, continual change in the area of evolutionary computation justifies the inclusion of some time for workshops. A workshop is a mini-conference focusing on a particular area of research and/or application, that may not be covered fully in the main conference. Following a call for workshops and acceptance, workshop organizers usually issue a separate call for participation distinct from the main call for papers of the conference. The IEEE CEC 2023 conference included three workshops.

IEEE CEC 2023 workshops
Workshop title
Evolutionary Computation for Explainable Artificial Intelligence (ECXAI)
A Sandbox for Teaching and Learning in CI for Pre-University and Undergraduate Students
Computational Intelligence for Adaptive Learning in Human-Machine Interaction

=== Poster sessions ===
As well as many presentations in the main part of the conference, plenary speakers, tutorials and workshops, some IEEE CEC conferences have also included poster sessions, allowing easy discussion with the originators of the research presenting the poster.

=== Competitions ===
As well presenting papers or posters participants can develop solutions that address the challenges of competitions that have been accepted by the conference organizers and displayed on the conference website in advance. IEEE CEC 2023 included a number of competitions. Several are shown in the table below. While not all the links to the competition websites are active, abstracts of competition entries are available in the proceedings.

Some competitions at IEEE CEC 2023
Competition title	Comments
Evolutionary Multi-task Optimization	What is the best way to address multi-task optimization using evolutionary computation?
Competition on Multiobjective Neural Architecture Search	Neural networks have often been developed independently of research in evolutionary computation. How can their combination address this problem?
Evolutionary Computation in the Energy Domain: Operation and Planning Application	Planning and operation of energy services may create complex systems that evolutionary computation can help solve

=== Journal to conference sessions ===
The IEEE publishes the IEEE Transactions on Evolutionary Computation a bimonthly journal for original peer-reviewed papers in the field of evolutionary computation. IEEE CEC conferences may include sessions for presentation about, and discussion regarding, articles already published in this journal. In the Program of the IEEE Congress on Evolutionary Computation given as a list look for sessions labelled "J2C: Journal to Conference". This is a particularly relevant use of time since the conference and the Journal are published by the IEEE Computational Intelligence Society.

== Relevance ==
How important are IEEE CEC conferences? Earlier proceedings available in IEEE Xplore appear as online copies of multi-volume printed proceedings. The fact that they were multi-volume proceedings a number of years ago suggests that IEEE CEC conferences had a large number of attendees at that time.

More recent proceedings available within IEEE Xplore appear as online proceedings with the potential to print on demand if required. The display of such online proceedings makes it more difficult to compare them with the earlier online proceedings that were comparable with printed proceedings, but the listed programs available on conference websites, as well as the indication of parallel sessions, suggest that IEEE CEC conferences are well-attended and continue to be one of the most important conferences within the field of evolutionary computation.

== Alternative conferences ==
Other relevant conferences in the field of evolutionary computation include the Genetic and Evolutionary Computation Conference (GECCO), Parallel Problem Solving from Nature (PPSN) and EvoStar (also known as Evo*), which comprises four sub-conferences: EuroGP, EvoApplications, EvoCOP, and EvoMUSART.
