= Emma Hart =

Emma Hart may refer to:

- Emma, Lady Hamilton (1765–1815), English model and actress
- Emma Hart (artist) (born 1974), English mixed medium artist
- Emma Hart (computer scientist) (born 1967), English academic who works with computational intelligence
