= MVEE =

MVEE can refer to:

- MV & EE - a modern group of musicians
- Military Vehicles and Engineering Establishment - British defence research unit
- Multi-variant Execution Environment - a way of executing computer programs to improve security
