= PPSN =

PPSN may refer to:

- Personal Public Service Number, a unique identifier of individuals in Ireland
- Parallel Problem Solving from Nature, a peer-reviewed research conference focusing about natural computing
- Party for People with Special Needs, a minor political party in Ontario, Canada
