= Anna Nagurney =

American mathematician

Academic background
- Education: Brown University (A.B., Sc.B., Sc.M., Ph.D.)

Anna Nagurney is an American mathematician, economist, educator and writer in the field of Operations Management. Nagurney is the Eugene M. Isenberg Chair in Integrative Studies in the Isenberg School of Management at the University of Massachusetts Amherst in Amherst, Massachusetts. Previously, she held the John F. Smith Memorial Professorship of Operations Management at the Isenberg School of Management from 1998 to 2021.

== Early life and education ==
Nagurney received a BS in Applied Mathematics, an AB in Russian Language and Literature, an ScM in Applied Mathematics, and a PhD in Applied Mathematics, all from Brown University in Providence, Rhode Island. Nagurney's Doctoral Advisor at Brown University was Stella Dafermos.

More details on her early life can be found on her INFORMS HISTORY of OR Excellence biography and her Subject to interview.

== Career ==
Nagurney has contributed to many different areas of operations research with a focus on network systems from congested urban transportation networks to complex supply chains with applications to food, healthcare, disaster relief, among others. She is the author/co-author of over 235 refereed journal articles and 50 book chapters as well as 17 books. She has given keynote talks in many countries, including the US, UK, Colombia, Sweden, France, Germany, Ukraine, Italy, New Zealand, Canada, among others. She has supervised the doctoral dissertations of 23 PhDs. She has held visiting faculty appointments at MIT, at the Royal Institute of Technology (KTH) in Sweden, at SOWI at the University of Innsbruck, Austria, at the School of Business, Economics and Law at the University of Gothenburg in Sweden, and was a visiting fellow at All Souls College at Oxford University in the UK during the Trinity term in 2016.

She delivered the Omega Rho Distinguished Lecture, Networks to save the world: OR in Action, at the 2018 INFORMS Annual Meeting. She delivered the IFORS Distinguished Lecture, Human migration networks: How Operations Research can assist with refugees and supply chain labor shortages, at CLAIO 2022, Buenos Aires, Argentina, December 2022. In December 2024, she delivered the Blackett Lecture, NetwORks and Policies: OR to the Rescue, at the Royal Society in London, UK sponsored by the Operational Research Society. At the 2025 INFORMS Annual Meeting, she received the President's Award, whose purpose is to recognize, and thereby encourage, important contributions to the welfare of society by members of our profession at the local, national, or global level.

She is a member of the International Academic Board and of the Board of Directors of the Kyiv School of Economics, Kyiv, Ukraine. From February 2022 to August 2025, she served as Co-Chair of the Board of Directors.

She is one of the 44 women featured in the book, STEM Gems, by Stephanie Espy.

Her Google Scholar h-index is 77 and her work has been cited over 25,000 times.

== Honors and awards ==
- 1986 - Kempe Prize in honor of Tord Palander, Umea University, Umea, Sweden
- 1988 - NSF Visiting Professorship for Women
- 1989 - Samuel F. Conti Faculty Fellowship, University of Massachusetts Amherst
- 1991 - NSF Faculty Award for Women
- 2000 - Chancellor's Medal, University of Massachusetts Amherst
- 2002 - Fulbright/University of Innsbruck Distinguished Faculty Chair in Economics, Innsbruck, Austria
- 2005 - Award for Outstanding Accomplishments in Research and Creative Activity, University of Massachusetts Amherst
- 2005 - INFORMS Moving Spirit Award for Chapters
- 2005-2006 - Science Fellow, Radcliffe Institute for Advanced Study, Harvard University, Cambridge, MA
- 2007 - Fellow of the RSAI (Regional Science Association International)
- 2007 - WORMS (Women in Operations Research and the Management Sciences) Award of INFORMS
- 2008 - Fulbright Senior Specialist Award in Business Administration - Italy
- 2013 - Fellow of INFORMS (Institute for Operations Research and the Management Sciences)
- 2014 - University Medal awarded by the University of Catania, Italy
- 2016 - INFORMS Volunteer Service Award
- 2018 - Omega Rho Distinguished Lecture, at the 2018 INFORMS Annual Meeting.
- 2019 - Fellow of the Network Science Society
- 2019 - Constantin Caratheodory Prize, International Society of Global Optimization - ISOGO Prizes
- 2020 - Harold Larnder Prize, Canadian Operational Research Society
- 2022 - IFORS Distinguished Lecture, at CLAIO 2022, Buenos Aires, Argentina.
- 2024 - The Blackett Memorial Lecture, The OR Society at the Royal Society, London, UK
- 2025 - INFORMS President's Award
- 2025 - Fellow of the Operational Research Society (UK)

== Quotes ==
"We are living in a nonlinear world"-Anna Nagurney

== Publications ==
- 1993. Network Economics: A Variational Inequality Approach. Kluwer Academic Publishers.
- 1996. Projected Dynamical Systems and Variational Inequalities with Applications. With Ding Zhang. Kluwer Academic Publishers.
- 1997. Financial Networks: Statics and Dynamics. With Stavros Siokos. Springer.
- 1999. Environmental Networks: A Framework for Economic Decision-Making and Policy Analysis. With Kanwalroop Kathy Dhanda, and Padma Ramanujam. Edward Elgar Publishing.
- 1999. Network Economics: A Variational Inequality Approach (second edition). Kluwer Academic Publishers.
- 2000. Sustainable Transportation Networks'. Edward Elgar Publishing.
- 2002. Supernetworks: Decision-Making for the Information Age. With June Dong. Edward Elgar Publishing.
- 2003. Innovations in Financial and Economic Networks. (Editor). Edward Elgar Publishing.
- 2006. Supply Chain Network Economics: Dynamics of Prices, Flows, and Profits. Edward Elgar Publishing.
- 2009. Fragile Networks: Identifying Vulnerabilities and Synergies in an Uncertain World. With Qiang Qiang. Wiley.
- 2013. Networks Against Time: Supply Chain Analytics for Perishable Products. With Min Yu, Amir Masoumi and Ladimer Nagurney. Springer Briefs in Optimization.
- 2016. Competing on Supply Chain Quality: A Network Economics Perspective. With Dong Li. Springer.
- 2016. Dynamics of Disasters—Key Concepts, Models, Algorithms, and Insights. (Editor). With Illias S. Kotsireas and Panos M. Pardalos. Springer International Publishing AG.
- 2018. Dynamics of Disasters: Algorithmic Approaches and Applications, (Editor). With Illias S. Kotsireas and Panos M. Pardalos. Springer International Publishing Switzerland AG
- 2021. Dynamics of Disasters - Impact, Risk, Resilience, and Solutions, (Editor). With Illias S. Kotsireas, Panos M. Pardalos, and Arsenios Tsokas. Springer
- 2023. Labor and Supply Chain Networks, Springer
- 2024. Dynamics of Disasters - From Natural Phenomena to Human Activity, (Editor). With Illias S. Kotsireas, Panos M. Pardalos, Stefan Wolfgang Pickl, and Chrysafis Vogiatzis. Springer
