= Artificial life (disambiguation) =

Artificial life may refer to:

- Artificial life, a field of study using computer models
- Synthetic life, artificially created life forms
- Artificial Life, an academic journal
- Digital organism, computer programs that adapt and compete

== See also ==
- Artificial general intelligence – Type of AI with wide-ranging abilities
- Superintelligence – Hypothetical agent surpassing human intelligence
