= David E. Goldberg =

American computer scientist

- Born: September 26, 1953 (age 72)
- Education: University of Michigan
- Known for: Work in the field of genetic algorithms
- Scientific career
- Fields: Genetic algorithms
- Workplaces: University of Alabama (1984–1990); University of Illinois at Urbana-Champaign (1990–2010)
- Doctoral advisor: E. Benjamin Wylie; John Henry Holland
- Doctoral students: Kalyanmoy Deb; Hillol Kargupta

David Edward Goldberg (born September 26, 1953) is an American engineer, educator, and author, known for his contributions to genetic algorithms, engineering education, and the philosophy of engineering. He is a registered professional engineer in Pennsylvania and has held faculty positions at the University of Michigan, University of Alabama, University of Illinois at Urbana-Champaign, and served as a visiting professor at the National University of Singapore. Goldberg is recognized for his research in evolutionary computation, engineering education reform, and interdisciplinary approaches connecting philosophy and engineering.

== Early life and education ==
Goldberg earned a Bachelor of Science (BSE) in Civil Engineering in 1975, a Master of Science (MSE) in 1976, and a Ph.D. in Civil Engineering in 1983, all from the University of Michigan. During his graduate studies, he focused on the integration of fluid mechanics principles with computational methods, laying the groundwork for his later work in genetic algorithms.

His advisors were E. Benjamin Wylie and John Henry Holland. His students including Kalyanmoy Deb, Jeff Horn, and Hillol Kargupta.

== Career ==
Goldberg began his professional career at the United States Geological Survey (USGS) in 1975, working on modeling unsteady flows in open-channel networks. From 1976 to 1980, he worked at Stoner Associates, Inc. in Carlisle, Pennsylvania, initially as an engineer and later as a marketing manager, contributing to fluid flow simulation software development.

In 1984, Goldberg joined the University of Alabama as an Assistant Professor in the Department of Engineering Mechanics. He became an Associate Professor with tenure before leaving in 1990. While at Alabama, he received the NSF Presidential Young Investigator Award in 1985—the first in the university’s history—and authored the influential book Genetic Algorithms in Search, Optimization, and Machine Learning. At Alabama, he supervised the doctoral work of Kalyanmoy Deb, who would become a leading figure in evolutionary multi-objective optimization.

In 1990, Goldberg joined the University of Illinois at Urbana–Champaign, where he became a professor in the department then known as General Engineering (GE) renamed the Department of Industrial and Enterprise Systems Engineering in 2006 and director of the Illinois Genetic Algorithms Laboratory (IlliGAL). During this period, he also led initiatives to integrate engineering and computer science methods in problem-solving.

In 2003 he was appointed as the first holder of the Jerry S. Dobrovolny Professorship in Entrepreneurial Engineering. He is also a co-founder of ShareThis and, in 2007, co-founded the Illinois Foundry for Innovation in Engineering Education (iFoundry) at the University of Illinois. Through his work, Goldberg has been involved globally as a movement leader, leadership coach, and change management consultant, collaborating with individuals, organizations, and networks to promote systemic change in education.

In 2006, a blog post related to his book The Entrepreneurial Engineer sparked the creation of the first Workshop on Philosophy and Engineering, which later evolved into the Forum on Philosophy, Engineering, and Technology (fPET).

In 2007, Goldberg co-founded and co-chaired the first Workshop on Philosophy and Engineering (WPE), which aimed to explore the conceptual foundations of engineering practice. He co-edited the resulting publication, Philosophy and Engineering: An Emerging Agenda (Springer, 2010). The workshop was later reorganized as the Forum on Philosophy, Engineering, and Technology (fPET) in 2010; Goldberg and Diane Michelfelder, former provost of Macalester College, co-chaired its steering committee through 2024, while individual conferences were chaired by designated conference chairs.

He also co-edited Philosophy and Engineering: Reflections on Practice, Principles, and Process (Springer, 2013). Goldberg is a registered professional engineer in Pennsylvania, holding license number PE029588E since 1980.

From 2010 to 2013, Goldberg served as a Distinguished Visiting Professor at the National University of Singapore (NUS), where he worked with Dean Chan Eng Soon on developing a design-centric engineering curriculum.

In 2011, he received a certificate in Leadership Coaching from Georgetown University. He was named a Distinguished Academic Partner of Franklin W. Olin College of Engineering from 2012 to 2014. Goldberg was recognized as an IEEE Pioneer in Evolutionary Computation in 2010 and won the Wickenden Award from the American Society for Engineering Education in 1997 for his 1996 paper on engineering education.

== Research and scholarly works ==
Goldberg is known for his contributions to genetic algorithms (GAs) and evolutionary computation, particularly in the areas of selection schemes, allele representation, and multi-objective optimization. His influential papers include A Niched Pareto Genetic Algorithm for Multiobjective Optimization (Horn, Nafpliotis, & Goldberg, 1994), A Comparative Analysis of Selection Schemes Used in Genetic Algorithms (Goldberg & Deb, 1991), Genetic Algorithms with Sharing for Multimodal Function Optimization, Alleles, Loci and the Traveling Salesman Problem (Goldberg & Lingle, 1985), and Messy Genetic Algorithms: Motivation, Analysis, and First Results (Goldberg, Korb, & Deb, 1989). His 1989 book, Genetic Algorithms in Search, Optimization, and Machine Learning, has been translated into multiple languages and is widely cited in the field.

In addition to his technical research, Goldberg has contributed to the philosophy of engineering, co-founding and co-chairing the first Workshop on Philosophy and Engineering (WPE) in 2007, which later evolved into the Forum on Philosophy, Engineering, and Technology (fPET). He co-edited the publications Philosophy and Engineering: An Emerging Agenda (Springer, 2010) and Philosophy and Engineering: Reflections on Practice, Principles, and Process (Springer, 2013), exploring the intersection of philosophical inquiry and engineering practice, and addressing the conceptual foundations of engineering education and professional practice.

Goldberg has identified Design of Innovation: Lessons from and for Competent Genetic Algorithms (Kluwer, 2002) as his most important synthesis of his work on genetic algorithms, presenting GAs as a model of recombinative innovation and introducing compact analytical models that show how population sizing, population takeover, and recombinative effectiveness interact to solve boundedly difficult problems.

=== Post-Genetic Algorithms Career ===
Following his work in genetic algorithms, Goldberg shifted focus toward engineering education and leadership development. In 2010, he completed leadership coaching training at Georgetown University and resigned his tenured professorship to found ThreeJoy Associates, an organization dedicated to transforming engineering education. That year, he also worked at the National University of Singapore, assisting in the development of a design-centric curriculum. Upon returning to the United States, he collaborated with multiple universities worldwide on curriculum reform. In 2014, Goldberg co-authored A Whole New Engineer with Mark Somerville, presenting a vision of engineers as innovators beyond technical proficiency. He followed this with A Field Manual for a Whole New Education (2023), which introduces the 4 Sprints and Spirits Method (4SSM), a practical framework for implementing rapid curricular and cultural change in higher education.

Goldberg hosted the podcast Big Beacon Radio from 2015 to 2018, focused on engineering education and innovation.

=== Notable students ===
Goldberg has supervised numerous graduate students, several of whom have gone on to influential careers in academia and industry. Notable students include Kalyanmoy Deb, a leading researcher in evolutionary computation; Hillol Kargupta, a computer scientist; Charles L. Karr, former dean of engineering at the University of Alabama and current president of the University of Alabama in Huntsville; and Georges Harik, an early employee at Google and computer scientist.

== Awards and honors ==
- NSF Presidential Young Investigator Award, 1985
- Wickenden Award, American Society for Engineering Education, 1997
- IEEE Pioneer in Evolutionary Computation, 2010
- Distinguished Academic Partner, Olin College of Engineering, 2012–2014

== Publications ==
Genetic Algorithms Publications

- Horn, J.; Nafpliotis, N.; Goldberg, D.E. (1994). "A niched Pareto genetic algorithm for multiobjective optimization". Proceedings of the First IEEE Conference on Evolutionary Computation. IEEE World Congress on Computational Intelligence. IEEE. pp. 82–87. doi:10.1109/icec.1994.350037. ISBN 0-7803-1899-4.
- Goldberg, David E.; Deb, Kalyanmoy (1991), "A Comparative Analysis of Selection Schemes Used in Genetic Algorithms", Foundations of Genetic Algorithms, Elsevier, pp. 69–93, doi:10.1016/b978-0-08-050684-5.50008-2, ISBN 978-0-08-050684-5
- Goldberg, D.E; Richardson, J. (1996). "Genetic algorithms with dynamic niche sharing for multimodal function optimization". Proceedings of IEEE International Conference on Evolutionary Computation. pp. 41–49. doi:10.1109/icec.1996.542701. ISBN 0-7803-2902-3.
- Goldberg, David E.; Korb, Bradley; Deb, Kalyanmoy. "Messy Genetic Algorithms: Motivation, Analysis, and First Results". Complex Systems. 3 (5).

Educational-Philosophical Non-Book Works

- Goldberg, David E. (2009). "Engineering rigor and its discontents: Philosophical reflection as curative to math-physics envy". philsci-archive.pitt.edu.
- Goldberg, David E. (2009-10-18). "The importance of pairwork in interdisciplinary and educational initiatives". Proceedings of the 39th IEEE International Conference on Frontiers in Education Conference. FIE'09. San Antonio, Texas, USA: IEEE Press: 272–275. ISBN 978-1-4244-4715-2.
- Goldberg, D.E. (2010). "The missing basics & other philosophical reflections for the transformation of engineering education". In Grasso, D.; Burkins, M. B (eds.). Holistic engineering education: Beyond technology. New York: Springer-Verlag. pp. 145–158. doi:10.1007/978-1-4419-1393-7. ISBN 978-1-4419-1392-0.
- Goldberg, D.E. (2010). "Why philosophy, why now? Engineering responds to the crisis of a creative er". In Poel, van de; Goldberg, D. E. (eds.). Philosophy and engineering: An emerging agenda. Philosophy of Engineering and Technology. Vol. 2. Berlin: Springer. pp. 255–265. doi:10.1007/978-90-481-2804-4. ISBN 978-90-481-2803-7.
- Goldberg, David E. (2013), "Is Engineering Philosophically Weak?", in Michelfelder, Diane P; McCarthy, Natasha; Goldberg, David E. (eds.), Philosophy and Engineering: Reflections on Practice, Principles and Process, Philosophy of Engineering and Technology, vol. 15, Dordrecht: Springer Netherlands, pp. 391–405, doi:10.1007/978-94-007-7762-0_30, ISBN 978-94-007-7762-0
