= Kenneth De Jong =

American computer scientist

Kenneth Alan De Jong (born 1944) is an American computer scientist and professor emeritus at George Mason University. He is one of the pioneers in evolutionary computation.

== Education and career ==
De Jong was a student of John Henry Holland at the University of Michigan, where he completed a Ph.D. in 1975 with a dissertation on genetic algorithms. He became a faculty member at George Mason University in 1984.

He is the author of the textbook Evolutionary Computation: A Unified Approach (MIT Press, 2006), and was the founding editor-in-chief of the journal Evolutionary Computation, which published its first volume in 1993.

== Recognition ==
De Jong was the 2005 recipient of the Evolutionary Computation Pioneer Award of the IEEE Computational Intelligence Society. He is also the recipient of a lifetime achievement award of the Evolutionary Programming Society. He was a distinguished speaker of the Association for Computing Machinery in 2014.
