= Learnable evolution model =

The learnable evolution model (LEM) is a non-Darwinian methodology for evolutionary computation that employs machine learning to guide the generation of new individuals (candidate problem solutions). Unlike standard, Darwinian-type evolutionary computation methods that use random or semi-random operators for generating new individuals (such as mutations and/or recombinations), LEM employs hypothesis generation and instantiation operators.

The hypothesis generation operator applies a machine learning program to induce descriptions that distinguish between high-fitness and low-fitness individuals in each consecutive population. Such descriptions delineate areas in the search space that most likely contain the desirable solutions. Subsequently, the instantiation operator samples these areas to create new individuals. LEM has been modified from optimization domain to classification domain by augmented LEM with ID3 (February 2013 by M. Elemam Shehab, K. Badran, M. Zaki and Gouda I. Salama).

== Selected references ==
- Cervone, P.; Franzese (January 2010), "Machine Learning for the Source Detection of Atmospheric Emissions", Proceedings of the 8th Conference on Artificial Intelligence Applications to Environmental Science, Code J1.7
- Wojtusiak, J.; Michalski, R. S. (2006), "The LEM3 implementation of learnable evolution model and its testing on complex function optimization problems", Proceedings of the 8th annual conference on Genetic and evolutionary computation, Seattle, WA, p. 1281, doi:10.1145/1143997.1144197, ISBN 978-1595931863, S2CID 6133889
- Wojtusiak, J. (July 8–12, 2006), "Initial Study on Handling Constrained Optimization Problems in Learnable Evolution Model", Proceedings of the Graduate Student Workshop at Genetic and Evolutionary Computation Conference, GECCO 2006
- Jourdan, L.; Corne, D.; Savic, D.; Walters, G. (2005), "Preliminary Investigation of the 'Learnable Evolution Model' for Faster/Better Multiobjective Water Systems Design", Evolutionary Multi-Criterion Optimization, Lecture Notes in Computer Science, vol. 3410, pp. 841–855, doi:10.1007/978-3-540-31880-4_58, ISBN 978-3-540-24983-2
- Domanski, P. A.; Yashar, D.; Kaufman, K.; Michalski, R. S. (April 2004), "An Optimized Design of Finned-Tube Evaporators Using the Learnable Evolution Model", International Journal of Heating, Ventilating, Air-Conditioning and Refrigerating Research, 10: 201–211
- Kaufman, K.; Michalski, R. S. (2000), "Applying Learnable Evolution Model to Heat Exchanger Design", Proceedings of the Seventeenth National Conference on Artificial Intelligence (AAAI-2000) and Twelfth Annual Conference on Innovative Applications of Artificial Intelligence (IAAI-2000): 1014–1019
- Cervone, G.; Michalski, R. S.; Kaufman, K. A. (July 2000). "Experimental validations of the learnable evolution model". Proceedings of the 2000 Congress on Evolutionary Computation. CEC00 (Cat. No.00TH8512). Vol. 2. pp. 1064–1071. doi:10.1109/CEC.2000.870765. ISBN 0-7803-6375-2. S2CID 3149132.
- Michalski, R. S. (2000), "LEARNABLE EVOLUTION MODEL Evolutionary Processes Guided by Machine Learning", Machine Learning, 38: 9–40, doi:10.1023/A:1007677805582
- Michalski, R .S. (June 11–13, 1998), "Learnable Evolution: Combining Symbolic and Evolutionary Learning", Proceedings of the Fourth International Workshop on Multistrategy Learning (MSL'98): 14–20
- H Yar, M. (June 11–13, 2016), "A survey on evolutionary computation: Methods and their applications in engineering", Mod. Appl. Sci: 14–20
