= Hillol Kargupta =

Indian businessman

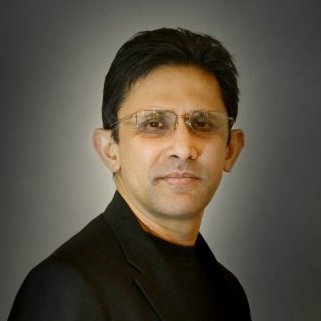
- Born: 1967; Darjeeling, India
- Education: University of Illinois at Urbana-Champaign
- Known for: President of Agnik, Contributions on Distributed Data Analytics
- Awards: IEEE Fellow, IEEE International Data Mining Conference 10-year Highest Impact Award, 2010 Frost & Sullivan Enabling Technology of Year Award, IBM Innovation Award in 2008, Paper selected for "Best of 2008 SIAM Data Mining Conference (SDM'08), and National Science Foundation CAREER award in 2001
- Scientific career
- Fields: Distributed Data Mining; Data Analytics for Connected Cars and IoT
- Workplaces: Agnik
- Doctoral advisor: David E. Goldberg

Hillol Kargupta is an academic, scientist, and entrepreneur.

He is a co-founder and president of Agnik, a data analytics company for connected cars and Internet of Things. He also serves as the chairman of the board for KD2U, an organization for promoting research, education, and practice of data analytics in distributed and mobile environments. He was a professor of computer science at the University of Maryland, Baltimore County, from until July 2014.

Kargupta received his PhD in computer science from University of Illinois at Urbana-Champaign, US, in 1996. Kargupta received his master's degree (M. Tech.) from Indian Institute of Technology Kanpur, India and undergraduate degree (B.Tech.) from Regional Engineering College Calicut, India. After finishing his PhD in 1995, Kargupta joined the Los Alamos National Laboratory as a postdoctoral researcher and then as a full technical staff member. He joined the Electrical Engineering and Computer Science Department of Washington State University in 1997 as an assistant professor. In 2001 Kargupta joined the Computer Science and Electrical Engineering Department of the University of Maryland at Baltimore County (UMBC). He spent 13 years at the UMBC and became a full professor in 2009. In 2008, he also founded the Society for Knowledge Discovery in Distributed and Ubiquitous (KD2U) Environments. He currently serves as the president of Agnik.

== Awards ==
- IEEE 10-Year Highest Impact Paper award.
- SIAM (Society of Industrial and Applied Mathematics) annual best student paper award, 1996.
