= Evolvable hardware =

Field of hardware development

Evolvable hardware (EH) is a field focusing on the use of evolutionary algorithms (EA) to create specialized electronics without manual engineering. It brings together reconfigurable hardware, evolutionary computation, fault tolerance and autonomous systems. Evolvable hardware refers to hardware that can change its architecture and behavior dynamically and autonomously by interacting with its environment.

== Introduction ==
In its most fundamental form an evolutionary algorithm manipulates a population of individuals based on their fitness as determined by the degree to which they satisfy some given condition. In this case, each individual is a description of how to construct a candidate circuit. Each circuit is assigned a fitness, which indicates how well a candidate circuit satisfies the design specification. The evolutionary algorithm uses stochastic operators to evolve new circuit configurations from existing ones. Done properly, over time the evolutionary algorithm will evolve a circuit configuration that exhibits desirable behavior.

Each candidate circuit can either be simulated or physically implemented in a reconfigurable device. Typical reconfigurable devices are field-programmable gate arrays (for digital designs) or field-programmable analog arrays (for analog designs). At a lower level of abstraction are the field-programmable transistor arrays that can implement either digital or analog designs.

The concept was pioneered by Adrian Thompson at the University of Sussex, England, who in 1996 used an FPGA to evolve a tone discriminator that used fewer than 40 programmable logic gates, and had no clock signal. This is an unusually small design for such a device, and relied on exploiting peculiarities of the hardware that engineers normally avoid. For example, one group of gates has no logical connection to the rest of the circuit, yet is crucial to its function.

== Motivation ==
In many cases, conventional design methods (formulas, etc.) can be used to design a circuit. But in other cases, the design specification doesn't provide sufficient information to permit using conventional design methods. For example, the specification may only state the desired behavior of the target hardware.

In other cases, an existing circuit must adapt—i.e., modify its configuration—to compensate for faults or perhaps a changing operational environment. For instance, deep-space probes may encounter sudden high-radiation environments, which alter a circuit's performance; the circuit must self-adapt to restore as much of the original behavior as possible.

== Finding the fitness of an evolved circuit ==
The fitness of an evolved circuit is a measure of how well the circuit matches the design specification. Fitness in evolvable hardware problems is determined via two methods:

- extrinsic evolution: all circuits are simulated to see how they perform,
- intrinsic evolution: physical tests are run on actual hardware.

In extrinsic evolution, only the solution from the final population of the evolutionary algorithm with the highest fitness is physically implemented. In contrast, with intrinsic evolution, every individual in every generation of the EA's population is physically realized and tested.

== Future research directions ==
Evolvable hardware problems fall into two categories: original design and adaptive systems. Original design uses evolutionary algorithms to design a system that meets a predefined specification. Adaptive systems reconfigure an existing design to counteract faults or a changed operational environment.

Original design of digital systems is not of much interest because industry already can synthesize enormously complex circuitry. For example, one can buy intellectual property cores to synthesize USB port circuitry, Ethernet, microcontrollers and even entire RISC processors. Some research into original design still yields useful results, for example, genetic algorithms have been used to design logic systems with integrated fault detection that outperform hand-designed equivalents.

However, the original design of analog circuitry is comparatively unexplored. Its industry is not as mature as is the digital design industry. Adaptive systems have been and remain an area of interest.

== See also ==
- Self-management (computer science)
- Programmable logic device
