= Parallel Problem Solving from Nature =

Computer science esearch conference

Parallel Problem Solving from Nature (PPSN)
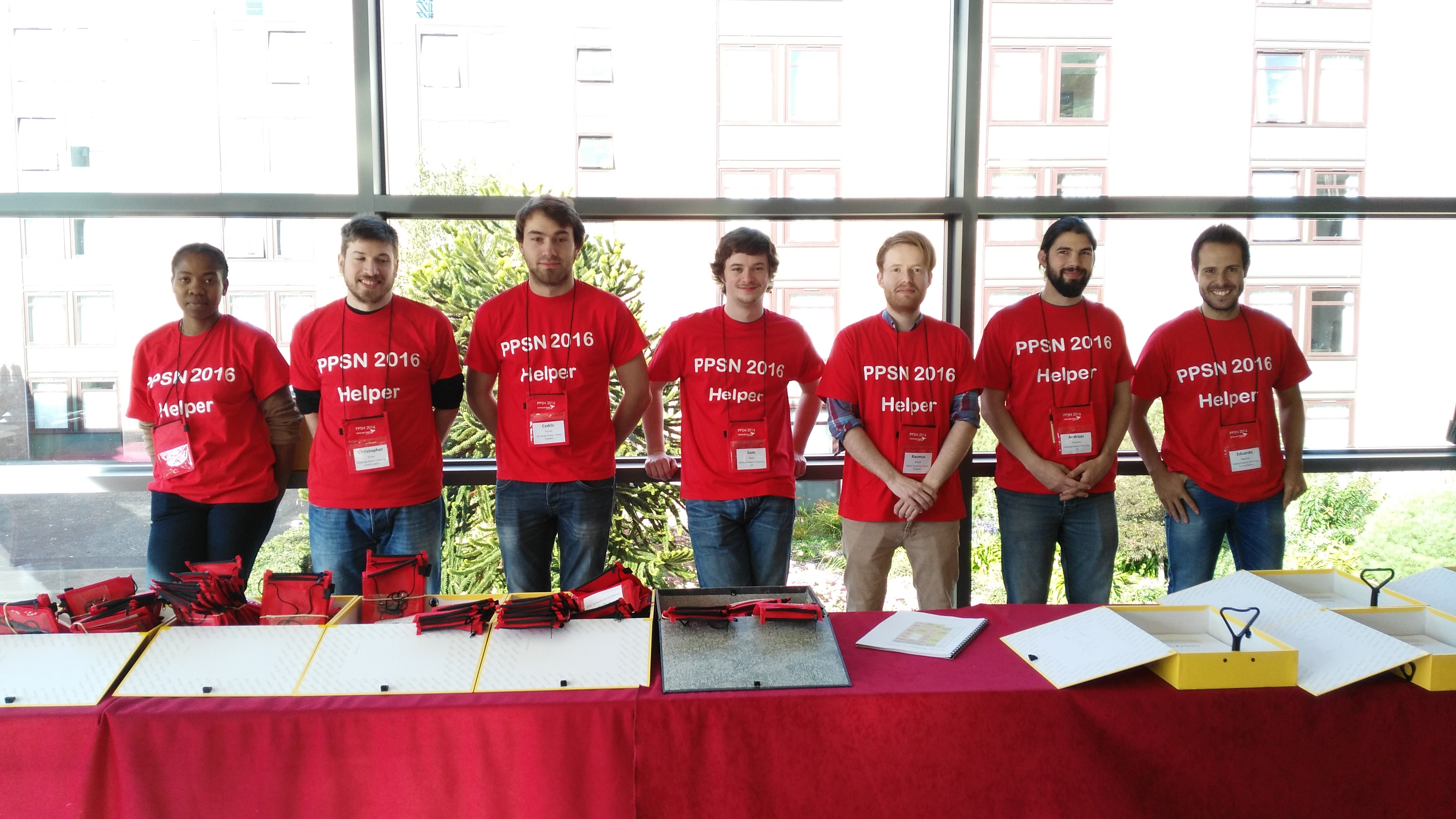
- Student helpers ready for PPSN 2016 in Edinburgh
- Status: Active
- Genre: Conference
- Frequency: Biennially
- Years active: 36
- Inaugurated: 1990
- Founders: Bernard Manderick, Reinhard Männer, Heinz Mühlenbein and Hans-Paul Schwefel
- Most recent: 2024
- Next event: 2026
- Area: Europe

Parallel Problem Solving from Nature (PPSN) is a peer-reviewed research conference focusing on the topic of natural computing. As such it includes a wide scope of computer science. It originated in 1990 and has been held biennially across European locations ever since. Papers selected for PPSN conferences are presented as posters and published in proceedings in the Springer Lecture Notes in Computer Science series. PPSN conferences also include presentations by keynote speakers representing diverse viewpoints in the field, tutorials given by experts, and workshops for discussion of topics that may not be fully represented in the main conference. These activities that should advance the field of natural computing probably explain why PPSN gained an A-ranking in the 2023 CORE computer science conference ranking system, reflecting its importance as a venue in which computer science researchers can participate.

== Origin ==
The idea behind PPSN emerged around 1989-1990 when Bernard Manderick, Reinhard Männer, Heinz Mühlenbein, and Hans-Paul Schwefel, realised they shared a common field of study that was not covered by the conferences on Operations Research, Physics, or Computer Science they attended regularly.

The field of genetic algorithms had already been established in the form of the ICGA conference in 1985, but the founders of PPSN wanted a wider focus, with algorithms that included problem solving, parallel computing and the use of natural metaphors (such as Darwinian evolution or Boltzmann dynamics).

The success of the first PPSN event at Dortmund encouraged its organisers to start a biennial conference series, as a European counterpart to the American-based ICGA (which in 1999 merged with the Genetic Programming conference to give rise to GECCO).

Analogies to natural processes included the thermodynamic process of annealing, immune systems and neural networks, as well as other paradigms, with Darwinian evolution being by far the most frequently used metaphor.

In this way, evolutionary algorithms and evolutionary computation became the common denominator for the PPSN approach to problem solving by mimicking biological principles like populations, birth, death, mutation, recombination, and natural selection.

== History ==
So far, eighteen PPSN conferences have been held. The table below describes their dates, locations and cites their websites and proceedings, where accessible. The importance of Dortmund, as the location of the Technical University of Dortmund (de:Technische Universität Dortmund), where the conference originated, as the location of many successor conferences and as the location of on-going relevant research, should not be understated.

Parallel Problem Solvings from Nature (PPSN) Conferences
Year	Dates	Location	Website	Proceedings
1990	1–3 October	Dortmund	No	LNCS 496
1992	28–30 September	Brussels	No	PPSN II
1994	9–14 October	Jerusalem	No	LNCS 866
1996	22–26 September	Berlin	No	LNCS 1141
1998	27–30 September	Amsterdam	No	LNCS 1498
2000	16–20 September	Paris	No	LNCS 1917
2002	7–11 September	Granada	No	LNCS 2439
2004	18–22 September	Birmingham	No	LNCS 3242
2006	9–13 September	Reykyavik	No	LNCS 4193
2008	13–17 September	Dortmund	Yes	LNCS 5199
2010	11–15 September	Krakow	Yes	LNCS 6238, LNCS 6239
2012	1–5 September	Taormina	No	LNCS 7491, LNCS 7492
2014	13–17 September	Ljubljana	No	LNCS 8672
2016	17–21 September	Edinburgh	Yes	LNCS 9921
2018	8–12 September	Coimbra	No	LNCS 11101, LNCS 11102
2020	5–9 September	Leiden	No	LNCS 12269, LNCS 12270
2022	10–14 September	Dortmund	No	LNCS 13398, LNCS 13399
2024	14–18 September	Hagenberg	Yes	LNCS 15148, LNCS 15149, LNCS 15150, LNCS 15151
2026	29 August-2 September	Trento	Yes	Pending

== Organisation ==
Each PPSN conference as any peer-reviewed research conference requires a substantial amount of organisation. The organisers are people from the research community covered by the conference. Due to the long history of the conference it is not possible to present all organisers of all conferences. For some recent conferences the organisers can be identified from the conference website. For other recent conferences where the website is no longer available the conference organisers are listed in the Table of Contents Front Matter of the Conference Proceedings. In the table below the main organisers of the most recent PPSN conferences are given. The sources of the information about organisation are cited adjacent to each year.

Hans-Paul Schwefel, recognised for his founding role in PPSN conferences, has been Honorary Chair of the PPSN conferences from 2020 to 2024 listed below. It may be assumed that he will continue in that position during the forthcoming PPSN 2026, but that has not yet been confirmed. When PPSN was held in Leiden in 2020 Grzegorz Rozenberg was also an Honorary Chair.

In addition to the organisers listed in the table below, there are others, whom may not always be recognised in each conference proceedings, or through the same title. Local Chairs or Local Support Chairs are very important to make sure that the conference takes place smoothly in the agreed venue. Some conferences have listed Technical Support Chairs or Online Conference Chairs. This will be important to ensure that the equipment in the venue works as expected. This may also have had particular importance in 2020 due the impact of the COVID-19 pandemic, requiring the conference to take place entirely online.

Other organisers were not identified consistently across the three conferences that have completed below, nor in the one forthcoming. This does not imply that they were less important than those included in the table. These included a Keynote Chair, a Competition Chair, an Industrial Liaison Chair and a Social Media Chair.

Not included in the table because of the very large number of people involved are the Programme Committee. Reporting to the Programme Committee Chairs, these are the people who carry out the peer-review process to ensure that PPSN conferences maintain a high standard of academic rigour. A full list of Programme Committee members can be found in the Table of Contents Front Matter of the PPSN conference proceedings following the list of conference organisers given in the Organization section.

Organisation of PPSN conferences
Year	2020	2022	2024	2026
Location	Leiden	Dortmund	Hagenberg	Trento
General Chairs	Thomas Bäck and Mike Preuss	Günter Rudolph	Michael Affenzeller and Stephan Winkler	Giovanni Iacca
Programme Committee Chairs	Carola Doerr, Michael Emmerich and Heike Trautmann	Hernán Aguirre, Pascal Kerschke, Gabriela Ochoa and Tea Tušar	Heike Trautmann, Tea Tušar, Penousal Machado and Thomas Bäck	Doina Bucur, Antonio Della Cioppa, Ting Hu and Eric Medvet
Proceedings Chairs	André Deutz and Hao Wang	Anna V Kononova	Anna V Kononova	Giorgia Nadizar and Anil Yaman
Workshops Chair	Anna Esparcia-Alcázar	Christian Grimm	Roman Kalkreuth	Sarah L. Thomson
Tutorials Chair	Ofer Shir	Heike Trautmann	Fabrício Olivetti de França	Yuri Lavinas
Publicity Chairs	Bas van Stein and Wenjian Luo	Nicolas Fischöder and Peter Svoboda	Jan Zenisek, Christian Haider and Louise Buur	Jessica Mégane and Jéssica Parente

== Format ==
Each Parallel Problem Solving from Nature (PPSN) conference includes a variety of activities to update and inform participants about the latest trends in natural computing. Since each conference is biennial a lot may have changed since the last one. Keynote speakers are invited to each conference to give expert lectures on particular topics in the field. Peer-reviewed papers are presented as posters to give a very broad view of the subjects covered by the conference. Time is available for workshops to allow discussion of topics that may not be included in the main conference. In order to enable participants to learn about some topics included in the very broad range of topics that PPSN covers, time is also allowed for tutorials.

=== Keynote speakers ===
The diversity of subjects that the conference covers means that it has attracted a wide range of keynote speakers in natural computing and related areas. Keynote speakers are listed on PPSN conference websites, or if the website is not available, in the Table of Contents Front Matter of the Conference Proceedings. (An inline reference is made to that in the 2022 Conference Proceedings in the table below as an example.).

Year	Keynote speakers
1998	Grzegorz Rozenberg, Nicholas Gessler, and Lawrence Davis
2000	Aaron Sloman, Luc Steels and Henrik Hautop Lund
2002	Alexander Nareyek, Roderic Guigó and William Hart
2004	Mandyam V. Srinivasan, Benjamin W. Wah and C. Lee Giles
2006	Herschel Rabitz, Nadia Busi, and Edward Tsang
2008	Levent Tunçel, Thomas Breitling and Arndt von Haeseler
2010	Jon Garibaldi, Zbigniew Michalewicz and Darrell Whitley
2012	Angelo Cangelosi, Natalio Krasnogor, Panos M. Pardalos, and Leslie G. Valiant
2014	Jadran Lenarčič, Thomas Bäck and A. E. (Gusz) Eiben
2016	Susan Stepney, Josh Bongard and Andrew Philippides
2018	Ahmed Elgammal, Francis Heylighen and Kurt Mehlhorn
2020	Eric Postma, Carme Torras and Christian Stöcker
2022	Doina Bucar, Claudio Semini and Travis Waller
2024	Oliver Schütze, Richard Küng and Bernardino Romera-Paredes

=== Papers ===
Similar to many other research conferences, PPSN invites the submission of papers. These are peer-reviewed and the ones selected for publication will be published in the conference proceedings published in the Springer Lecture Notes in Computer Science series, cited for past conferences in the table above, given in the history section. A possibly unique feature of PPSN conferences is that accepted papers are not oral presentations in the conference, they are presented in a poster session. This allows more papers to be included, as well as allowing attendees to gain more information beyond the poster when the conference proceedings are published.

=== Workshops ===
Each PPSN conference includes workshops, these are intended as "forums for presenting and discussing new emerging approaches or for critical reflections within a subfield. They provide an excellent opportunity to meet people with similar interests, to be exposed to cutting-edge research and to exchange ideas in an informal setting" (quoting the Call for Workshops for the forthcoming PPSN 2026 conference). They typically take place over one day or half a day, although some may be smaller. A call for workshop proposals is published by the conference organisers well in advance so that accepted workshop organisers can manage their workshop independently of the main conference programme, other than with the knowledge of the time slot within which their workshop will fit. PPSN 2024 included four workshops described in the table below.

Workshops at PPSN 2024
Number	Organisers	Title
1	Tinkle Chugh, George De Ath, Paul Kent, Alma Rahat and Kaifeng Yang	BOSS: Bayesian and Surrogate-assisted Search and Optimisation
2	Carola Doerr, Vanessa Volz, Boris Naujoks, Olaf Mersmann, Mike Preuss and Pascal Kerschke	Good Benchmarking Practices for Evolutionary Computation BENCHMARKING
3	Benjamin Doerr, Concha Bielza, John McCall and Weijie Zheng	30 Years of EDAs
4	Heike Trautmann, Lennart Schapermeier and Oliver Schütze	Multimodal Multiobjective Optimization

=== Tutorials ===
PPSN conferences include tutorial sessions where experts in particular areas of the fields covered by the conference present in order to enable participants to learn about topics they may have been unfamiliar with before the conference. Unlike workshops, which may be regarded as mini-conferences and involve multiple presenters, tutorials at PPSN conferences are organised as detailed lectures, usually with only one or a few presenters. Thus there is time to include more tutorials than workshops in each PPSN conference. The table below provides information about the tutorials presented at the PPSN 2024 conference, the times and dates of which are shown in the PPSN 2024 Program. Titles are shown as given in the 2024 program.

Tutorials at PPSN 2024
Number	Presenter(s)	Title
1	Ke Li	Decomposition Evolutionary Multi-Objective Optimization: What We Know from the Literature and What We are not Clear from a Data Science Perspective
2	Benjamin Doerr	A Gentle Introduction to Theory (for Non-Theoreticians)
3	Nikolaus Hansen	CMA-ES
4	Ofer M Shir	Mathematical Programming as a Complement to Bio-inspired Optimization
5	Martin Krejca	Theory of Estimation of Distribution Algorithms
6	Michal Pluhacek, Adam Vikorin and Roman Senkerik	Large Language Models as Tools for Metaheuristic Design: Exploring Challenges and Opportunities
7	Bogodan Fipič and Aljosa Vodopija	Constraint Handling in Multiobjective Optimization
8	Kate Smith-Miles and Mario Andrés Muñoz Acosta	Instance Space Analysis for Rigorous and Insightful Algorithm Testing
9	Chao Qian	Pareto Optimization for Subset Selection: Theories and Practical Algorithms
10	Jeroen Rook, Manuel López-Ibáñez and Heike Trautmann	Advanced Use of Automatic Algorithm Configuration: Single- and Multi-Objective Approaches
11	Michael Hellwig, Steffan Fink and Hans-Georg Beyer	Introduction to Evolution Strategies for Constrained Optimization Problems
12	Per Kristian Lehre	Runtime Analysis of Population-based Evolutionary Algorithms
13	Anna V Kononova, Niki van Stein and Diederick Vermetten	Structural bias in optimsation algorithms
14	Nelishia Pillay	Transfer Learning in Evolutionary Spaces
15	Per Kristian Lehre and Mario A Hevia Fajardo	Adversarial Optimisation through Competitive Coevolutionary Algorithms
16	A E (Gusz) Eiben	Robot Evolution

=== Importance ===
Parallel Problem Solving from Nature (PPSN) conferences have become an established feature of European natural computing and evolutionary computation research, over the 35 years that they have been held. They have been held over a longer period than the other biennial European conference in related fields, Artificial Evolution, which has recently also been held in even-numbered years, but not on conflicting dates. In earlier years the Artificial Evolution conference was held in odd-numbered years, thus preventing any risk of conflict. Because Artificial Evolution conferences have usually been held in locations in France, PPSN has offered a wider range of locations.

Although they are not annual, they have complemented the annual European EvoStar conferences, the latter being focused through sub-conferences on four areas arguably narrower in total than the scope of PPSN (EuroGP: genetic programming, EvoApplications: applications of evolutionary computation, EvoCOP: evolutionary computation in combinatorial optimisation and EvoMUSArt: computational intelligence in music, sound, art and design).

PPSN conferences do not include the very large number of simultaneous tracks that much larger global conferences in evolutionary computation and related fields, such as GECCO or IEEE CEC can do. So PPSN conferences cannot attract a similar number of attendees to each conference as these conferences. However, being smaller and located in venues typically easier to reach across Europe, they enable interaction between participants to be easier. Through peer-review they maintain a high standard of publication from each conference. Via keynote speakers, tutorials and workshops they help advance the fields included within the scope of the conference.

It is thus not surprising that Parallel Problem Solving from Nature gained an A-ranking in the 2023 CORE (Computing Education and Research) conference rankings. GECCO and FOGA (Foundations of Genetic Algorithms) were two other conferences in the field that also gained A-rankings, but there were many others that gained lower ranks, if at all, supporting the importance of PPSN.

A new round of ICORE ranking is being prepared in 2025, but it is not due to be released until 2026.

=== Status ===
Researchers in natural computing and related fields are familiar with PPSN as a conference in which to present their work and in which to participate, possibly taking on roles as organisers. Details of the next conference in 2026 are available. This article will need to be updated from September 2026 onwards, after the conclusion of that conference.
