= Emma Hart (computer scientist) =

English computer scientist

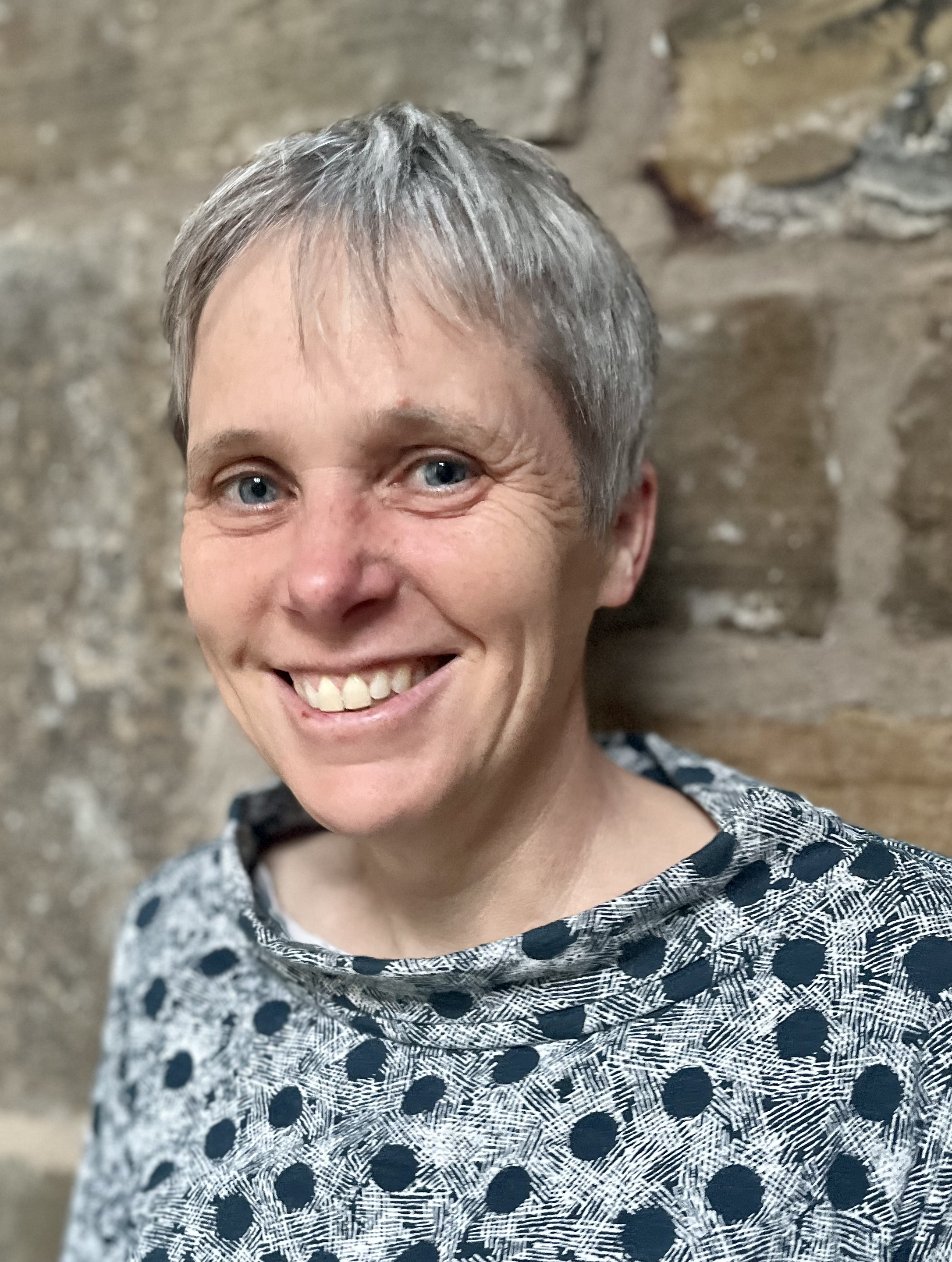
- Born: 1967 (age 58–59); Middlesbrough, England
- Education: University of Oxford; University of Edinburgh
- Known for: Evolutionary algorithms, optimisation
- Awards: 2018, Bronze Award in International Human-Competitive Awards (Humies)
- Scientific career
- Fields: Computer science
- Workplaces: Edinburgh Napier University
- Thesis: Immunology as a metaphor for computational information processing: Fact or fiction? (2002)
- Doctoral advisor: Peter Ross

External videos
- "An Insider's Guide to Artificial Intelligence: Evolutionary Computation", Laura van Beers talks to Professor Emma Hart
- "Emma Hart - Full Interview", Sentient Technologies, Aug 16, 2018
- "Self-assembling robots and the potential of artificial evolution" TED talk 2021

Professor Emma Hart, FRSE (born 1967) is an English computer scientist known for her work in artificial immune systems (AIS), evolutionary computation and optimisation. She is a professor of computational intelligence at Edinburgh Napier University, was editor-in-chief of Evolutionary Computation (MIT Press), and D. Coordinator of the Future & Emerging Technologies (FET) Proactive Initiative, Fundamentals of Collective Adaptive Systems.

== Early life and education ==
Hart was born in Middlesbrough, England in 1967. In 1990 she graduated from the University of Oxford with a first class BA(Hons) in Chemistry. She then continued her studies at the University of Edinburgh, graduating with an MSc in Artificial Intelligence in 1994, followed by a PhD that explored the use of immunology as an inspiration for computing, examining a range of techniques applied to optimization and data classification problems. Her dissertation was titled Immunology as a metaphor for computational information processing: Fact or fiction?, and her doctoral advisor was Peter Ross.

== Career ==
In 2000 Hart took a position as a lecturer at Edinburgh Napier University, and was promoted to a Reader, Professor, and in 2008 Chair in Natural Computation. She is now director of the Centre of Algorithms, Visualisation and Evolving Systems (CAVES) group in the School of Computing. She continues to research in the area of developing novel bio-inspired techniques for solving a range of real-world optimisation and classification problems, as well as exploring the fundamental properties of immune-inspired computing through modelling and simulation. She is also involved in editorial activity and currently occupies the position of Editor-in-Chief of the Journal of Evolutionary Computation (MIT Press).

Her interests lie in the area of bio-inspired computing, in particular artificial immune systems (AIS). She also undertakes research in three main areas: optimisation, self-organising/self-adaptive systems, and artificial intelligence.

Hart is D. Coordinator of Fundamentals of Collective Adaptive Systems (FoCAS), a Future and Emerging Technologies Proactive Initiative funded by the European Commission under FP7.

== Selected works ==
=== Conference talks ===
- Hart, Emma. "Lifelong learning in optimization (video)". 28th European Conference on Operational Research. The Association of European Operational Research Societies.
- Hart, Emma (December 2021). "Self-assembling robots and the potential of artificial evolution". TED talk 2021.

=== Journal articles ===
- "An immune system approach to scheduling in changing environments". E.Hart, P.Ross. 1999. Proceedings of the 1st Annual Conference on Genetic and Evolutionary Computation (2), 1559–1566.
- "Exploiting the analogy between immunology and sparse distributed memories: A system for clustering non-stationary data". E.Hart, P.Ross. 2002. 1st International Conference on Artificial Immune Systems.
- "Evolutionary scheduling: A review". E Hart, P Ross, D Corne. 2005. Genetic Programming and Evolvable Machines 6(2), 191–220. DOI: https://doi.org/10.1007/s10710-005-7580-7
- "Application areas of AIS: The past, the present and the future". E.Hart, J.Timmis. 2008. Applied soft computing 8(1), 191–201. DOI: https://doi.org/10.1016/j.asoc.2006.12.004
- "Structure versus function: a topological perspective on immune networks". E.Hart, H.Bersini, F.Santos. 2010. Natural computing 9(3), 603–624. DOI: https://doi.org/10.1007/s11047-009-9138-8
- "On the life-long learning capabilities of a nelli*: A hyper-heuristic optimisation system". E.Hart, K.Sim. 2014. International Conference on Parallel Problem Solving from Nature, 282–291. DOI: https://doi.org/10.1007/978-3-319-10762-2_28
- "A hyper-heuristic ensemble method for static job-shop scheduling". E.Hart, K.Sim. 2016. Evolutionary computation 24(4), 609-635. DOI: https://dx.doi.org/10.1162/EVCO_a_00183

== Awards and recognition ==
- 2016, Featured article on Lifelong Learning in Optimisation, IFORS newsletter
- 2016, "A Combined Generative and Selective Hyper-heuristic for the Vehicle Routing Problem" presented at GECCO 2016 (Denver, USA), ACM
- 2016, "A Hybrid Parameter Control Approach Applied to a Diversity-based Multi-objective Memetic Algorithm for Frequency Assignment Problems" presented at WCCI 2016 (Vancouver, Canada), IEEE
- 2017, Keynote Speaker, 2017 International Joint Conference on Computational Intelligence
- 2018, Bronze Award in International Human-Competitive Awards (Humies), International Conference on Genetic and Evolutionary Computation, Kyoto Japan
- 2018, Nomination for best paper award, GECCO 18, Kyoto, Japan
- 2022, Elected Fellow of the Royal Society of Edinburgh
