= ShareThis =

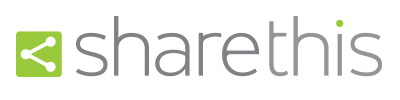
- Website type: Social Bookmarking and Sharing Tool
- Owner: ShareThis
- Creator: ShareThis
- Employees: 103 (2017)
- Website: http://sharethis.com/
- Registration: Free

ShareThis is a technology company headquartered in Palo Alto, CA, with offices in New York, Chicago, and Los Angeles. It offers free website tools and plugins for online content creators. ShareThis collects data on user behavior, and provides this to advertisers and technology companies for ad targeting, analytics, and customer acquisition purposes. ShareThis has an exclusive license with the University of Illinois for patent applications made by co-founder David E. Goldberg. The patents include genetic algorithms and machine learning technologies used for the purposes of information collection and discovery based on a user's sharing behavior.

== History ==
ShareThis was founded in 2007 by David E. Goldberg, an engineering professor at University of Illinois at Urbana-Champaign, and Tim Schigel.

In July 2011, Kurt Abrahamson joined the company as CEO and served for 7 years before transitioning into an Executive Chairman role.

In February 2019, The Register published a story indicating that 16 companies, including ShareThis, were the victims of a security incident. A security breach exposed 41 million account records containing name, username, email address, DES-hashed password, gender, date of birth, and other profile info. The data was listed for sale on the dark web, and following publishing of The Register's article, ShareThis verified the breach and sent notifications to compromised users. ShareThis then launched an investigation with forensic and data security experts to review the incident and identify measures to improve security.

== See also ==
- List of social bookmarking websites
- AddThis
- AddToAny
