= Kalyanmoy Deb =

Indian computer scientist academic

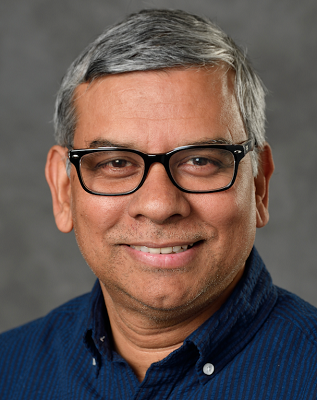
- Born: 1963 (age 62–63); Udaipur, Tripura, India
- Awards: Infosys Prize (2011); IEEE Fellow (2012); TWAS Prize (2012); ASME Fellow (2014); ACM Fellow (2022)

Academic background
- Education: IIT Kharagpur (BTech); University of Alabama (MS, PhD)
- Thesis: Binary and Floating-Point Function Optimization using Messy Genetic Algorithms (1991)
- Doctoral advisor: David E. Goldberg

Academic work
- Discipline: Multiobjective optimization and evolutionary algorithms
- Institutions: Department of Computer Science, University of Alabama

Kalyanmoy Deb (born 1963) is an Indian computer scientist. Deb is currently the Endowed Shelby Distinguished Professor in the Department of Computer Science, Lee J. Styslinger Jr. College of Engineering at the University of Alabama.

Deb established the Kanpur Genetic Algorithms Laboratory at IIT Kanpur in 1997 and the Computational Optimization and Innovation (COIN) Laboratory at Michigan State in 2013, which has since moved to the University of Alabama. In 2001, Wiley published a textbook written by Deb titled Multi-Objective Optimization using Evolutionary Algorithms as part of its series titled "Systems and Optimization". In an analysis of the network of authors in the academic field of evolutionary computation by Carlos Cotta and Juan-Julián Merelo, Deb was identified as one of the most central authors in the community and was designated as a "sociometric superstar" of the field.

== Background and career ==
Deb was born in 1963 in Udaipur, Tripura, then the smallest state of India. He received his B.Tech. in Mechanical Engineering (1985) from IIT Kharagpur and his MS (1989) and PhD (1991) in Engineering Mechanics from the University of Alabama. His PhD advisor was David E. Goldberg, and his PhD thesis was titled Binary and Floating-Point Function Optimization using Messy Genetic Algorithms. From 1991 to 1992 he was a postdoc at UIUC. In 1993, he became a professor of mechanical engineering at IIT Kanpur, where he went on to hold the Deva Raj Endowed Chair (2007–2010) and the Gurmukh and Veena Mehta Endowed Chair (2011–2013). For his next position, he left for Michigan State University, where he served as the Herman E. & Ruth J. Koenig Endowed Chair Professor in the Department of Electrical and Computer Engineering, held appointments in the Department of Computer Science and Engineering and the Department of Mechanical Engineering, and was named University Distinguished Professor in 2021. Deb retired from Michigan State University in July 2026 and then moved to serve at his alma mater, the University of Alabama.

== Research ==
=== NSGA ===
Deb is a highly cited researcher, with 234,000+ Google Scholar citations and an h-index of 150. A large fraction of his citations come from his work on nondominated-sorting genetic algorithms for multiobjective optimization. In 1994, Deb and coauthor Nidamarthi Srinivas introduced one of (Note: Previous nondominated-sorting genetic algorithms had been introduced by Carlos M. Fonseca and Peter J. Fleming (Genetic algorithms for multiobjective optimization: formulation, discussion and generalization, 1993) and Jeffrey Horn (Northern Michigan University), Nicholas Nafpliotis, and David E. Goldberg (A niched Pareto genetic algorithm for multiobjective optimization, 1994).) the first nondominated-sorting genetic algorithms, which they termed "NSGA".

=== NSGA-II ===
In 2002, Deb and coauthors Amrit Pratap, Sameer Agarwal, and T.A.M.T. Meyarivan introduced a notion of crowding distance for an individual, which "calculates a measure of how close an individual is to its neighbors." They also introduced a faster (Note: Faster compared to Srinivas and Deb's implementation in NSGA (1994).) way to implement nondominated sorting, by for every individual keeping track of which other individuals it strictly dominates. By incorporating crowding distance, elitism, (Note: See also the section Elitist selection in the Selection (genetic algorithm) page.) and the faster implementation of nondominated sorting into the original NSGA, Deb and his coauthors modified the original NSGA and made it faster and more reliable. (Note: Incorporating the faster implementation of nondominated sorting and elitist selection made the algorithm faster. Incorporating crowding distance and elitist selection made the algorithm more reliable.) They termed this modification "NSGA-II". According to the Web of Science Core Collection database, this paper was the first paper solely by Indian authors to have more than 5,000 citations. As of 2025, the paper has accumulated over 65,000 citations.

=== NSGA-III ===
In 2013, Deb and coauthor Himanshu Jain proposed a modification of NSGA-II for solving many-objective optimization problems with 10+ objectives. (Note: Many-objective optimization is a subfield of multiobjective optimization focusing on problems that have a large number of constraints (four or more constraints).) They termed this modification "NSGA-III".

== Awards and honors ==
Deb is a Fellow of three Indian academies: the Indian National Academy of Engineering (2004), the Indian Academy of Sciences (2006), the Indian National Science Academy (2011). He is also a fellow of the IEEE (2012), the ASME (2014), and the ACM (2022).

He has been awarded the Infosys Prize in Engineering and Computer Science (2011) for his contributions to evolutionary multi-objective optimization, the TWAS Prize in Engineering Sciences (2012) from the World Academy of Sciences, and the IEEE Computational Intelligence Society Evolutionary Computation Pioneer Award (2018) for his sustained contributions to evolutionary multi-objective optimization.

Other honors include a Humboldt Fellowship (1998–1999), the Friedrich Wilhelm Bessel Research Award from the Alexander von Humboldt Foundation (2002), the Shanti Swarup Bhatnagar Prize in Engineering Sciences (2005), service as a Finland Distinguished Professor (FiDiPro) from 2007 to 2009, the MCDM Edgeworth-Pareto Award (2008) for contributions to multiple-criteria decision making, the J. C. Bose National Fellowship (2011), and an honorary doctorate from the University of Jyväskylä, Finland (2013).
