= Anne Auger =

French computer scientist

Anne Auger is a French numerical analyst and computer scientist interested in benchmarks and performance analysis of black-box methods for numerical optimization. She is a director of research for the French Institute for Research in Computer Science and Automation (Inria), and the leader of RandOpt, the Randomized Optimization team at the Inria Saclay research center.

Auger earned an agrégation in mathematics in 2000 at Paris-Sud University and a diploma in numerical analysis at Pierre and Marie Curie University in 2001. Next she completed a Ph.D. in 2004 at Pierre and Marie Curie University, with the dissertation Contributions théoriques et numériques à l'optimisation continue par Algorithmes Evolutionnaires, jointly supervised by Claude Le Bris and Marc Schoenauer. She earned a habilitation in 2016 at Paris-Sud University.
