= Carola Doerr =

German computer scientist

- Born: Carola Winzen; 1984 (age 41–42)
- Occupation: Computer Scientist
- Awards: Otto Hahn Medal (2013)

Carola Doerr (née Winzen, born 1984) is a German computer scientist who works in France as a director of research at the French National Center for Scientific Research (CNRS), affiliated with the Laboratoire d'Informatique de Paris 6. Her research concerns the theoretical and empirical analysis of metaheuristics for black-box optimization.

== Education and career ==
Carola Winzen was born in 1984 in Würselen, and did her secondary education in Konstanz, with a year abroad in Paraguay. She received a diploma in mathematics from the University of Kiel in 2007, and continued her studies at Saarland University and the nearby Max Planck Institute for Informatics, completing her Ph.D. in 2011. Her doctoral dissertation, Toward a Complexity Theory for Randomized Search Heuristics: Black-Box Models, was jointly supervised by Kurt Mehlhorn and Benjamin Doerr.

After continuing as a postdoctoral researcher at the Max Planck Institute for Informatics, she moved to France in 2012 for a second postdoctorate at Paris Diderot University, funded by the Alexander von Humboldt Foundation. She has been a permanent researcher with CNRS since 2013. She received her habilitation in 2020, and became a director of research for the CNRS in 2022.

== Recognition ==
Doerr is a 2013 recipient of the Otto Hahn Medal, and a 2022 recipient of the CNRS Bronze Medal.
