= Panos M. Pardalos =

Greek scientist and engineer

Panos M. Pardalos is a Greek scientist and engineer, currently a Distinguished Professor and the Paul and Heidi Brown Preeminent Professor in Industrial and Systems Engineering at University of Florida.

He was elected to the 2006 class of Fellows of the Institute for Operations Research and the Management Sciences.
