= Evolutionary Computation (journal) =

- Discipline: Evolutionary computation
- Language: English
- Edited by: Thomas Bäck and Hao Wang

Publication details
- History: 1993-present
- Publisher: MIT Press (United States)
- Frequency: Quarterly
- Impact factor: 3.826 (2016)

Standard abbreviations
- ISO 4: Evol. Comput.

Indexing
- ISSN: 1063-6560 (print); 1530-9304 (web)
- OCLC no.: 44169764

Links
- Journal homepage; Online access

Evolutionary Computation is a peer-reviewed academic journal published four times a year by the MIT Press. The journal serves as an international forum for researchers exchanging information in the field which deals with computational systems drawing their inspiration from nature.

According to the Journal Citation Reports, the journal has a 2016 impact factor of 3.826.

Editors-in-chief are Thomas Bäck and Hao Wang. They succeeded Emma Hart, who was editor-in-chief from 2017 until 2023. In turn, she succeeded Hans-Georg Beyer, who was editor-in-chief from 2010 until 2016. Kenneth A De Jong was the founding editor-in-chief.
