= Swarm intelligence =

Collective behavior of decentralized, self-organized systems

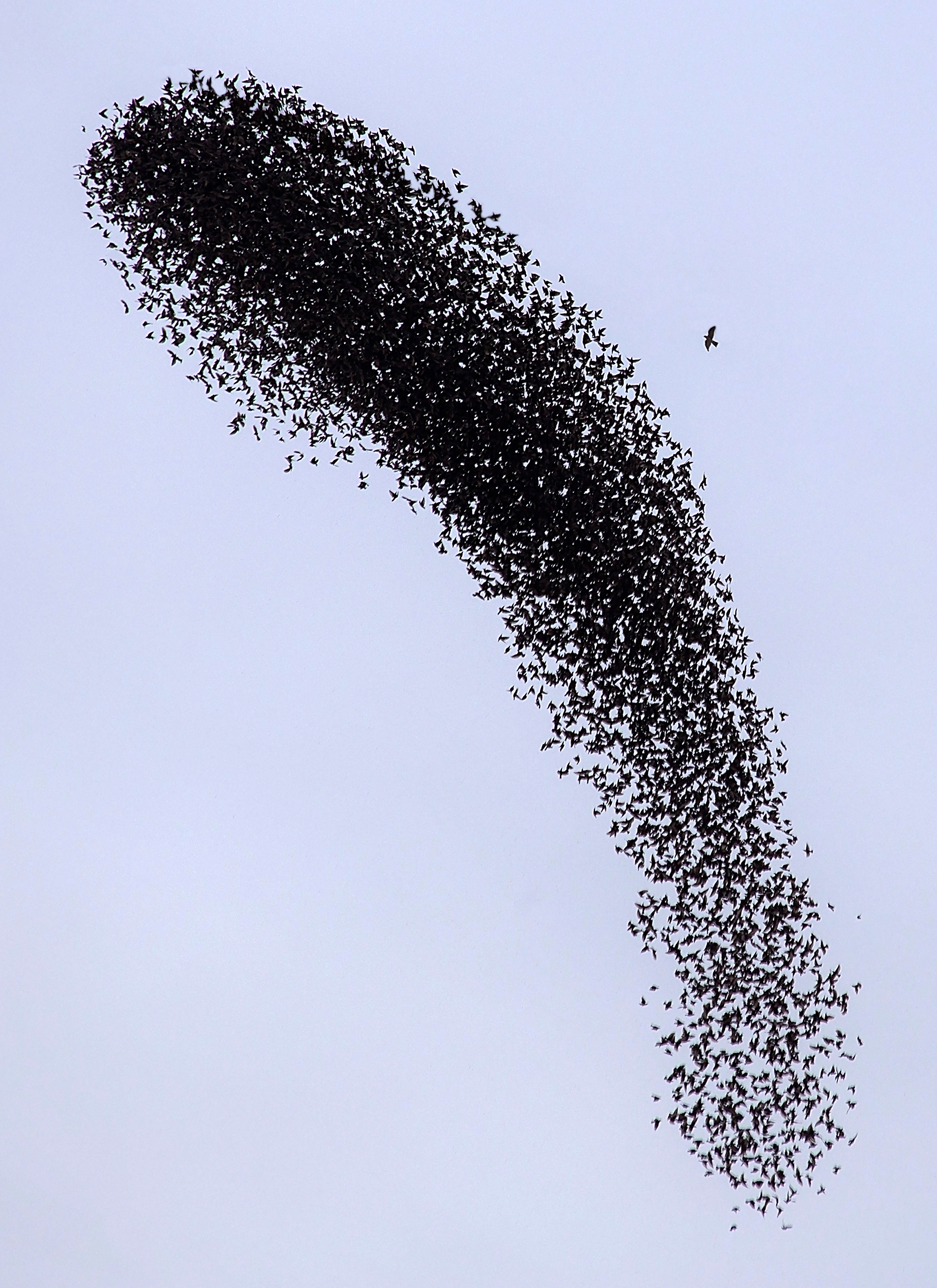
A flock of starlings reacting to a predator

Swarm intelligence (SI) is the collective behavior of decentralized, self-organized systems, natural or artificial. The concept is employed in work on artificial intelligence. The expression was introduced by Jing Wang and Gerardo Beni in 1989, in the context of cellular robotic systems.

Swarm intelligence systems consist typically of a population of simple agents or boids interacting locally with one another and with their environment. The inspiration often comes from nature, especially biological systems. The agents follow very simple rules, and although there is no centralized control structure dictating how individual agents should behave, local, and to a certain degree random, interactions between such agents lead to the emergence of "intelligent" global behavior, unknown to the individual agents. Examples of swarm intelligence in natural systems include ant colonies, bee colonies, bird flocking, hawks hunting, animal herding, bacterial growth, fish schooling and microbial intelligence.

The application of swarm principles to robots is called swarm robotics while swarm intelligence refers to the more general set of algorithms. Swarm prediction has been used in the context of forecasting problems. Similar approaches to those proposed for swarm robotics are considered for genetically modified organisms in synthetic collective intelligence.

== Models of swarm behavior ==
=== Boids (Reynolds 1987) ===
Boids is an artificial life program, developed by Craig Reynolds in 1986, which simulates flocking. It was published in 1987 in the proceedings of the ACM SIGGRAPH conference. The name "boid" corresponds to a shortened version of "bird-oid object", which refers to a bird-like object.

As with most artificial life simulations, Boids is an example of emergent behavior; that is, the complexity of Boids arises from the interaction of individual agents (the boids, in this case) adhering to a set of simple rules. The rules applied in the simplest Boids world are as follows:

- separation: steer to avoid crowding local flockmates
- alignment: steer towards the average heading of local flockmates
- cohesion: steer to move toward the average position (center of mass) of local flockmates

More complex rules can be added, such as obstacle avoidance and goal seeking.

=== Self-propelled particles (Vicsek et al. 1995) ===
Self-propelled particles (SPP), also referred to as the Vicsek model, was introduced in 1995 by Vicsek et al. as a special case of the boids model introduced in 1986 by Reynolds. A swarm is modelled in SPP by a collection of particles that move with a constant speed but respond to a random perturbation by adopting at each time increment the average direction of motion of the other particles in their local neighbourhood. SPP models predict that swarming animals share certain properties at the group level, regardless of the type of animals in the swarm. Swarming systems give rise to emergent behaviours which occur at many different scales, some of which are turning out to be both universal and robust. It has become a challenge in theoretical physics to find minimal statistical models that capture these behaviours.

=== Social potential fields (Reif et al. 1999) ===
Social Potential Fields, developed in 1999 by John H. Reif and Hongyan Wang, is one of the earliest models for Swarm Intelligence, developed for use for autonomous control of robot swarm systems that may consist of from hundreds to perhaps tens of thousands or more autonomous robots. It is the first paper to apply a potential field model to distributed autonomous multi-robot control. A Social Potential Field defines simple artificial force laws between pairs of robots or robot groups. These force laws are inverse-power force laws, incorporating both attraction and repulsion, similar but more general compared to the force laws found in molecular dynamics. As one of simplest examples, they define a force law where attraction dominates over long distances and repulsion dominates on short distances. The force laws can be distinct between various robots. An individual robot's motion is controlled by the resultant artificial force imposed by other robots and other components of the system. The Social Potential Fields approach is distributed since the force calculations and motion control can be done in an asynchronous and distributed manner. Using specially tailored force laws, they demonstrate complex behaviors and what might be viewed as "social relations' among robots. Therefore, the model was termed "Social Potential Fields”. They demonstrated by computer simulations that the method can yield interesting and useful behaviors among robots, including clustering, guarding, escorting, patrolling, etc. The 1999 paper envisioned many industrial and military applications such as assembling, transporting, hazardous inspection, patrolling, and military control of swarm systems. Their simulations showed the social potential fields method is robust in that the method can tolerate errors in sensors and actuators. The Social Potential Fields paper also extended the social potential fields model to use spring laws as force laws.

== Metaheuristics ==
Evolutionary algorithms (EA), particle swarm optimization (PSO), differential evolution (DE), ant colony optimization (ACO) and their variants dominate the field of nature-inspired metaheuristics. This list includes algorithms published up to circa the year 2000. A large number of more recent metaphor-inspired metaheuristics have started to attract criticism in the research community for hiding their lack of novelty behind an elaborate metaphor. For algorithms published since that time, see List of metaphor-based metaheuristics. Popular modern post-2000 examples include Grey Wolf Optimization (GWO), which replicates the dynamic hunting mechanisms and social leadership hierarchies of wolves in nature.

Metaheuristics lack a confidence in a solution. When appropriate parameters are determined, and when sufficient convergence stage is achieved, they often find a solution that is optimal, or near close to optimum – nevertheless, if one does not know optimal solution in advance, a quality of a solution is not known. In spite of this obvious drawback it has been shown that these types of algorithms work well in practice, and have been extensively researched, and developed. On the other hand, it is possible to avoid this drawback by calculating solution quality for a special case where such calculation is possible, and after such run it is known that every solution that is at least as good as the solution a special case had, has at least a solution confidence a special case had. One such instance is Ant-inspired Monte Carlo algorithm for Minimum Feedback Arc Set where this has been achieved probabilistically via hybridization of Monte Carlo algorithm with Ant Colony Optimization technique.

=== Ant colony optimization (Dorigo 1992) ===
Ant colony optimization (ACO), introduced by Dorigo in his doctoral dissertation, is a class of optimization algorithms modeled on the actions of an ant colony. ACO is a probabilistic technique useful in problems that deal with finding better paths through graphs. Artificial 'ants'—simulation agents—locate optimal solutions by moving through a parameter space representing all possible solutions. Natural ants lay down pheromones directing each other to resources while exploring their environment. The simulated 'ants' similarly record their positions and the quality of their solutions, so that in later simulation iterations more ants locate for better solutions.

=== Particle swarm optimization (Kennedy, Eberhart & Shi 1995) ===
Particle swarm optimization (PSO) is a global optimization algorithm for dealing with problems in which a best solution can be represented as a point or surface in an n-dimensional space. Hypotheses are plotted in this space and seeded with an initial velocity, as well as a communication channel between the particles. Particles then move through the solution space, and are evaluated according to some fitness criterion after each timestep. Over time, particles are accelerated towards those particles within their communication grouping which have better fitness values. The main advantage of such an approach over other global minimization strategies such as simulated annealing is that the large number of members that make up the particle swarm make the technique impressively resilient to the problem of local minima.

=== Artificial Swarm Intelligence (2015) ===
Artificial Swarm Intelligence (ASI) is a method of amplifying the collective intelligence of networked human groups using control algorithms modeled after natural swarms. Sometimes referred to as Human Swarming or Swarm AI, the technology connects groups of human participants into real-time systems that deliberate and converge on solutions as dynamic swarms when simultaneously presented with a question ASI has been used for a wide range of applications, from enabling business teams to generate highly accurate financial forecasts to enabling sports fans to outperform Vegas betting markets. ASI has also been used to enable groups of doctors to generate diagnoses with significantly higher accuracy than traditional methods. ASI has been used by the Food and Agriculture Organization (FAO) of the United Nations to help forecast famines in hotspots around the world.

== Applications ==
Swarm Intelligence-based techniques can be used in a number of applications. The U.S. military is investigating swarm techniques for controlling unmanned vehicles. The European Space Agency is thinking about an orbital swarm for self-assembly and interferometry. NASA is investigating the use of swarm technology for planetary mapping. A 1992 paper by M. Anthony Lewis and George A. Bekey discusses the possibility of using swarm intelligence to control nanobots within the body for the purpose of killing cancer tumors. Conversely al-Rifaie and Aber have used stochastic diffusion search to help locate tumours. Swarm intelligence (SI) is increasingly applied in Internet of Things (IoT) systems, and by association to Intent-Based Networking (IBN), due to its ability to handle complex, distributed tasks through decentralized, self-organizing algorithms. Swarm intelligence has also been applied for data mining and cluster analysis. Ant-based models are further subject of modern management theory.

Swarm intelligence can be used in many practical areas where multiple simple agents work together to solve complex problems efficiently. It is commonly applied in optimization problems, such as route planning, scheduling, and resource allocation, where algorithms inspired by ants and birds help find the best solutions. In robotics, swarm intelligence is used for coordinating multiple robots in tasks like search and rescue, warehouse automation, and environmental monitoring. It is also widely used in network systems for efficient routing of data in the internet and wireless sensor networks.

In addition, swarm intelligence plays an important role in traffic and transportation systems, where it helps in traffic signal control, vehicle routing, and reducing congestion in smart cities. In machine learning and data mining, it is used for feature selection, clustering, and improving model performance. It is also applied in power systems for load balancing and energy optimization, especially in smart grids. Furthermore, swarm intelligence is used in healthcare and bioinformatics for tasks like drug discovery and gene analysis, and in gaming and simulations to create realistic group behaviors such as crowd movement or flocking.

=== Ant-based routing ===
The use of swarm intelligence in telecommunication networks has also been researched, in the form of ant-based routing. This was pioneered separately by Dorigo et al. and Hewlett-Packard in the mid-1990s, with a number of variants existing. Basically, this uses a probabilistic routing table rewarding/reinforcing the route successfully traversed by each "ant" (a small control packet) which flood the network. Reinforcement of the route in the forwards, reverse direction and both simultaneously have been researched: backwards reinforcement requires a symmetric network and couples the two directions together; forwards reinforcement rewards a route before the outcome is known (but then one would pay for the cinema before one knows how good the film is). As the system behaves stochastically and is therefore lacking repeatability, there are large hurdles to commercial deployment. Mobile media and new technologies have the potential to change the threshold for collective action due to swarm intelligence (Rheingold: 2002, P175).

The location of transmission infrastructure for wireless communication networks is an important engineering problem involving competing objectives. A minimal selection of locations (or sites) are required subject to providing adequate area coverage for users. A very different, ant-inspired swarm intelligence algorithm, stochastic diffusion search (SDS), has been successfully used to provide a general model for this problem, related to circle packing and set covering. It has been shown that the SDS can be applied to identify suitable solutions even for large problem instances.

Airlines have also used ant-based routing in assigning aircraft arrivals to airport gates. At Southwest Airlines a software program uses swarm theory, or swarm intelligence—the idea that a colony of ants works better than one alone. Each pilot acts like an ant searching for the best airport gate. "The pilot learns from his experience what's the best for him, and it turns out that that's the best solution for the airline," Douglas A. Lawson explains. As a result, the "colony" of pilots always go to gates they can arrive at and depart from quickly. The program can even alert a pilot of plane back-ups before they happen. "We can anticipate that it's going to happen, so we'll have a gate available," Lawson says.

=== Crowd simulation ===
Artists are using swarm technology as a means of creating complex interactive systems or simulating crowds.

==== Instances ====
The Lord of the Rings film trilogy made use of similar technology, known as Massive (software), during battle scenes. Swarm technology is particularly attractive because it is cheap, robust, and simple.

Stanley and Stella in: Breaking the Ice was the first movie to make use of swarm technology for rendering, realistically depicting the movements of groups of fish and birds using the Boids system.

Tim Burton's Batman Returns also made use of swarm technology for showing the movements of a group of bats.

Airlines have used swarm theory to simulate passengers boarding a plane. Southwest Airlines researcher Douglas A. Lawson used an ant-based computer simulation employing only six interaction rules to evaluate boarding times using various boarding methods.(Miller, 2010, xii-xviii).

=== Human swarming ===
Networks of distributed users can be organized into "human swarms" through the implementation of real-time closed-loop control systems. Developed by Louis Rosenberg in 2015, human swarming, also called artificial swarm intelligence, allows the collective intelligence of interconnected groups of people online to be harnessed. The collective intelligence of the group often exceeds the abilities of any one member of the group.

Stanford University School of Medicine published in 2018 a study showing that groups of human doctors, when connected together by real-time swarming algorithms, could diagnose medical conditions with substantially higher accuracy than individual doctors or groups of doctors working together using traditional crowd-sourcing methods. In one such study, swarms of human radiologists connected together were tasked with diagnosing chest x-rays and demonstrated a 33% reduction in diagnostic errors as compared to the traditional human methods, and a 22% improvement over traditional machine-learning.

The University of California San Francisco (UCSF) School of Medicine released a preprint in 2021 about the diagnosis of MRI images by small groups of collaborating doctors. The study showed a 23% increase in diagnostic accuracy when using Artificial Swarm Intelligence (ASI) technology compared to majority voting.

=== Swarm grammars ===
Swarm grammars are swarms of stochastic grammars that can be evolved to describe complex properties such as found in art and architecture. These grammars interact as agents behaving according to rules of swarm intelligence. Such behavior can also suggest deep learning algorithms, in particular when mapping of such swarms to neural circuits is considered.

=== Swarmic art ===
In a series of works, al-Rifaie et al. have successfully used two swarm intelligence algorithms—one mimicking the behaviour of one species of ants (Leptothorax acervorum) foraging (stochastic diffusion search, SDS) and the other algorithm mimicking the behaviour of birds flocking (particle swarm optimization, PSO)—to describe a novel integration strategy exploiting the local search properties of the PSO with global SDS behaviour. The resulting hybrid algorithm is used to sketch novel drawings of an input image, exploiting an artistic tension between the local behaviour of the 'birds flocking'—as they seek to follow the input sketch—and the global behaviour of the "ants foraging"—as they seek to encourage the flock to explore novel regions of the canvas. The "creativity" of this hybrid swarm system has been analysed under the philosophical light of the "rhizome" in the context of Deleuze's "Orchid and Wasp" metaphor.

A more recent work of al-Rifaie et al., "Swarmic Sketches and Attention Mechanism", introduces a novel approach deploying the mechanism of 'attention' by adapting SDS to selectively attend to detailed areas of a digital canvas. Once the attention of the swarm is drawn to a certain line within the canvas, the capability of PSO is used to produce a 'swarmic sketch' of the attended line. The swarms move throughout the digital canvas in an attempt to satisfy their dynamic roles—attention to areas with more details—associated with them via their fitness function. Having associated the rendering process with the concepts of attention, the performance of the participating swarms creates a unique, non-identical sketch each time the 'artist' swarms embark on interpreting the input line drawings. In other works, while PSO is responsible for the sketching process, SDS controls the attention of the swarm.

In a similar work, "Swarmic Paintings and Colour Attention", non-photorealistic images are produced using SDS algorithm which, in the context of this work, is responsible for colour attention.

The "computational creativity" of the above-mentioned systems are discussed in through the two prerequisites of creativity (i.e. freedom and constraints) within the swarm intelligence's two infamous phases of exploration and exploitation.

Michael Theodore and Nikolaus Correll use swarm intelligent art installation to explore what it takes to have engineered systems to appear lifelike.

== Notable researchers ==
- Maurice Clerc
- Nikolaus Correll
- Marco Dorigo
- Russell C. Eberhart
- Luca Maria Gambardella
- James Kennedy
- Alcherio Martinoli
- Craig Reynolds
- Magnus Egerstedt
- P. N. Suganthan

== See also ==
- Artificial immune systems
- Collaborative intelligence
- Collective effervescence
- Collective intelligence
- Group mind (science fiction)
- Cellular automaton
- Complex systems
- Differential evolution
- Dispersive flies optimisation
- Distributed artificial intelligence
- Evolutionary computation
- Global brain
- Harmony search
- Language
- Multi-agent system
- Myrmecology
- Promise theory
- Quorum sensing
- Population protocol
- Reinforcement learning
- Rule 110
- Self-organized criticality
- Spiral optimization algorithm
- Stochastic optimization
- Swarm Development Group
- Swarm robotic platforms
- Swarming
- SwisTrack
- Symmetry breaking of escaping ants
- The Wisdom of Crowds
- Wisdom of the crowd
