= Maurice Clerc =

Maurice Clerc may refer to:

- Maurice Clerc (mathematician)
- Maurice Clerc (organist)
