= Short Circutz =

- Genre: Comedy; Anthology
- Country of origin: Canada
- No. of episodes: 32 shorts

Production
- Running time: 1 hour 42 minutes

Original release
- Network: YTV
- Release: September 5, 1994 – August 31, 1997

Short Circutz is a series of short computer-animated videos that were played between television shows on YTV every afternoon and evening from September 5, 1994 until August 31, 1997.

Most videos were 1 to 4 minutes long, but did not always air at full length depending on the amount of time available to fill. The videos were all sampled from three film collections: The Mind's Eye, its sequel Beyond the Mind's Eye, and Imaginaria.

== List of shorts ==
- Virtual Reality
- Seeds Of Life
- Afternoon Adventure
- Brave New World
- Transformers
- Too Far
- Windows
- Nothing But Love
- The Pyramid
- Theatre Of Magic
- Voyage Home
- Creation
- Civilization Rising
- Heart Of The Machine
- Technodance
- Post Modern
- Love Found (Stella and Stanley in: Breaking the Ice)
- First Flight (Leaving The Bonds Of Earth)
- The Temple
- Imaginaria
- Anything Is Possible
- Locomotion
- The Adventures of André & Wally B.
- All Shapes & Sizes
- Rubber Duckies
- Gourmet Records
- Night Magic
- Down The Road
- Lucy & Remo
- Styro The Dog
- More Bells and Whistles
- Going Home

== Trivia ==
- Footage from the Laserdisc game Cube Quest is used more often than footage from any other individual clip in the shorts. Some examples include the jungle tunnel in "Creation," the many tunnels in "All Shapes and Sizes" and the flying ship in "All Shapes and Sizes."
- "More Bells and Whistles" is one of the earliest of Wayne Lytle's productions; Lytle now produces more complex variations on the idea with his company, Animusic.
- Some clips from the shorts are CGI commercials and promos, like an ID for MusiquePlus in Anything is Possible.
