= Lawrence Papay =

- Born: October 3, 1936; Weehawken, New Jersey, US
- Died: July 28, 2014 (aged 77); San Diego, California, US
- Education: Fordham University; MIT
- Occupations: Southern California Edison; National Academy of Engineering
- Spouse: Carol Papay
- Children: 3

Lawrence T. Papay (October 3, 1936 in Weehawken, New Jersey – July 28, 2014) was an American CEO and Principal of PQR who previously worked for the Integrated Solutions Sector as a vice-president and was a general manager of Bechtel.

== Early and personal life ==
Papay was born in Weehawken, New Jersey, on October 3, 1936, the youngest of four sons, to Joe and Elizabeth Papay, but grew up in Montvale. He obtained BS degree in physics from Fordham University in 1958 in New York City. Following graduation he served as a naval officer at the Officer Candidate School and at the Nuclear Power School of the Mare Island Naval Shipyard.

He married Carol in Ohio on New Year's Eve 1960 after which they moved to Vallejo, California. Together they had daughter Lisa and son Greg (born in 1961 and 1963, respectively). Following the birth of their children, the couple moved again, this time to Cambridge, Massachusetts where Papay received his MS degree and Sc.D. degrees in nuclear engineering from the MIT in 1965 and 1968 respectively. During that time, his wife Carol, gave birth to another girl, Diane.

In 1968 Lawrence Papay became the United States Atomic Energy Commission postdoctoral fellow at the European Commission's Joint Research Centre.

== Career ==
For 21 years Papay worked on nuclear power and system planning at the Southern California Edison. During the 1970s and 1980s he was SCE's industry leader and pioneer which led him to become elected into National Academy of Engineering in 1987. He joined Bechtel in 1991 and became partner, senior vice president and general manager of its Technology and Consulting Department.

From 2000 to 2004 Larry Papay served as sector vice president for the Integrated Solutions of the Science Applications International Corporation. From 2004 to 2014 he worked as CEO and principal of PQR and in 2005 and 2006 respectively he was appointed as CCST chairman, subsequently becoming its board member three years later.

== Positions ==
Lawrence Papay had served on various committees and panels, including Commission on Engineering and Technical Systems, Organizing Committee for the National Academies Summit on America's Energy Future, the Committee on Alternatives to Indian Point for Meeting Energy Needs, the Division on Engineering and Physical Sciences, the Committee on America's Energy Future Panel on Electricity from Renewables, the US-China Cooperation on Electricity from Renewables, Panel on Energy Facilities, Cities and Fixed Infrastructure, Committee on the Prospects for Inertial Confinement Fusion Energy Systems, DHS Science and Technology Directorate, the United States Department of Energy, the National Renewable Energy Laboratory and was a member of the board of directors of the Office of Technology Assessment.

While working for National Academy of Engineering, he served on its Governing and National Research Councils, and was a member of its selection committee for the Charles Stark Draper Prize.

== Death and legacy ==
Lawrence Papay died on July 28, 2014, after long battle with Parkinson's disease. In 2008 Fordham University established the Papay Science Award.
