= Humanoid ant algorithm =

The humanoid ant algorithm (HUMANT) is an ant colony optimization algorithm. The algorithm is based on a priori approach to multi-objective optimization (MOO), which means that it integrates decision-makers preferences into optimization process. Using decision-makers preferences, it actually turns multi-objective problem into single-objective. It is a process called scalarization of a multi-objective problem. The first multi-objective ant colony optimization (MOACO) algorithm was published in 2001, but it was based on a posteriori approach to MOO.

The idea of using the preference ranking organization method for enrichment evaluation to integrate decision-makers preferences into MOACO algorithm was born in 2009. HUMANT is the only known fully operational optimization algorithm that successfully integrates PROMETHEE method into ACO.

The HUMANT algorithm has been experimentally tested on the traveling salesman problem and applied to the partner selection problem with up to four objectives (criteria).
