= Graphical Models =

Computer graphics journal

Graphical Models is an academic journal in computer graphics and geometry processing publisher by Elsevier. As of 2021, its editor-in-chief is Bedrich Benes of the Purdue University.

== History ==
This journal has gone through multiple names. Founded in 1972 as Computer Graphics and Image Processing by Azriel Rosenfeld, it became the first journal to focus on computer image analysis. Its first change of name came in 1983, when it became Computer Vision, Graphics, and Image Processing. In 1991, it split into two journals, CVGIP: Graphical Models and Image Processing, and CVGIP: Image Understanding, which later became Computer Vision and Image Understanding. Meanwhile, in 1995, the journal Graphical Models and Image Processing removed the "CVGIP" prefix from its former name, and finally took its current title, Graphical Models, in 2002.

== Ranking ==
Although initially ranked by SCImago Journal Rank as a top-quartile journal in 1999 in its main topic areas, computer graphics and computer-aided design, and then for many years ranked as second-quartile, by 2020 it had fallen to the third quartile.
