= Susan Hackwood =

Susan Hackwood is an English-born engineer and academic administrator. She is a professor and researcher of electrical engineering at University of California, Riverside (UCR), credited for introducing the concept of electrowetting with Gerardo Beni in 1981. She was the executive director of the California Council on Science and Technology (CCST) 1995-2018. She also serves as director of her university's "Science to Policy" program.

Hackwood is married to Gerardo Beni. They have two children, Catherine and Juliet.

== Education ==
In 1976, Hackwood began studying for the bachelor of science in combined science at DeMontfort University in Leicester, UK. She finished it with honours in 1979. She received a Ph.D. in solid state ionics from De Montfort University in 1979. During the PhD, she had also worked at UC Berkeley and Chalmers Institute of Technology in Gothenburg, Sweden. She later worked at AT&T Bell Laboratories and completed postdoctoral research in solid-state device physics there in 1980.

== Career ==
From 1984 to 1989, she was a professor at UC Santa Barbara. She became the founding dean of the UC Riverside College of Engineering in 1990. Since 1995, she has been professor in electrical engineering at UCR.

From 1995 to 2018, Hackwood was Executive Director of the California Council on Science and Technology.

== Organization work ==
Hackwood co-founded the Journal of Robotic Systems.

She is director of the "Science to Policy" program at the University of California, Riverside. Hackwood has served as the chair of the board of governors of the U.S.–Mexico Foundation for Science. She is on the board of directors of the World Telehealth Initiative.

== Honors and recognition ==
Hackwood is a Fellow of the American Association for the Advancement of Science since 1998, and, also since 1998, of the Institute of Electrical and Electronics Engineers. She has been awarded honorary doctorates from De Montfort University and Worcester Polytechnic Institute.
