= Marco Dorigo =

Italian researcher in evolutionary computing

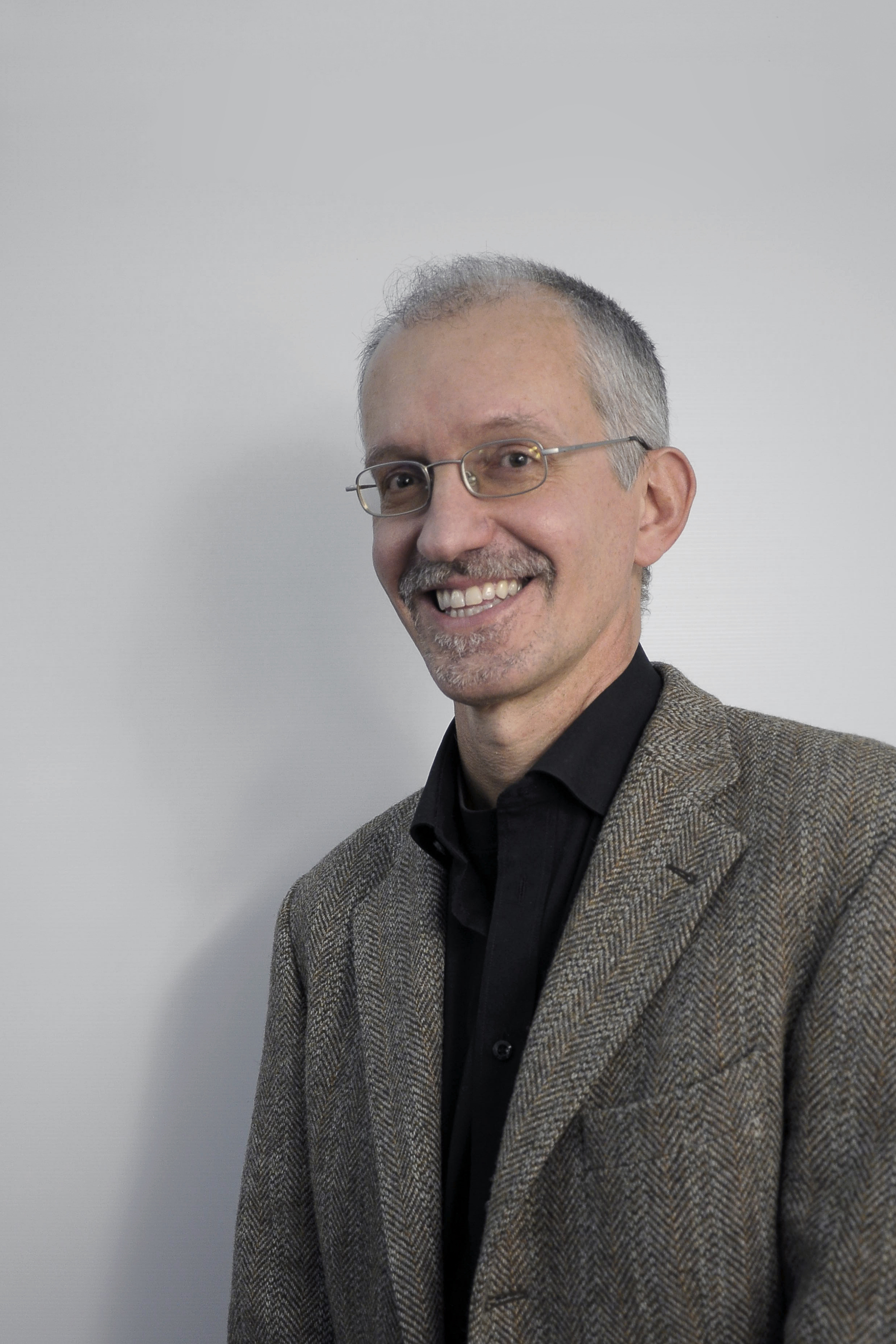
- Marco Dorigo in 2011
- Born: Marco Dorigo; August 26, 1961 (age 64); Milan, Lombardy, Italy.
- Education: Polytechnic University of Milan (PhD)
- Occupation: Research Director
- Employer: Université libre de Bruxelles
- Known for: Ant colony optimization; Swarm intelligence; Swarm robotics
- Awards: Marie Curie Research Excellence Award; Dr A. De Leeuw-Damry-Bourlart award in Applied Sciences; Cajastur International Prize for Soft Computing; IEEE Frank Rosenblatt Award
- Website: iridia.ulb.ac.be/~mdorigo

Marco Dorigo (born 26 August 1961, in Milan, Italy) is a research director for the Belgian Funds for Scientific Research and a co-director of IRIDIA, the artificial intelligence lab of the Université libre de Bruxelles. He received a PhD in System and Information Engineering in 1992 from the Polytechnic University of Milan with a thesis titled Optimization, learning, and natural algorithms. He is the leading proponent of the ant colony optimization metaheuristic (see his book published by MIT Press in 2004), and one of the founders of the swarm intelligence research field. Recently he got involved with research in swarm robotics: he is the coordinator of Swarm-bots: Swarms of self-assembling artifacts and of Swarmanoid: Towards humanoid robotic swarms, two swarm robotics projects funded by the Future and Emerging Technologies Program of the European Commission. He is also the founding editor and editor in chief of Swarm Intelligence, the principal peer-reviewed publication dedicated to reporting research and new developments in this multidisciplinary field.

For these contributions, in 2003 he was awarded the Marie Curie Research Excellence Award by the European Commission; on 22 November 2005, he was presented the Dr A. De Leeuw-Damry-Bourlart award in Applied Sciences by the King of Belgium, Albert II; in 2007 he received the Cajastur International Prize for Soft Computing, awarded by the European Centre for Soft Computing; and in 2015 he received the IEEE Frank Rosenblatt Award. He is the recipient of an ERC Advanced Grant (2010). He is the most cited author in three journals:

- IEEE Transactions on Systems, Man, and Cybernetics,
- IEEE Computational Intelligence Magazine, and
- Artificial Life.

He was named as an ACM Fellow in the 2025 class of fellows.

== Publications (selected) ==
- Ant Colony Optimization with Thomas Stützle, MIT Press, 2004 (ISBN 9780262042192).
- Swarm Intelligence : From Natural to Artificial Systems with Eric Bonabeau and Guy Theraulaz, Oxford University Press, 1999 (ISBN 0-19-513159-2).
- Robot Shaping with Marco Colombetti, MIT Press, 1998 (ISBN 0-262-04164-2).
- Ant algorithms for discrete optimization with Gianni Di Caro and Luca Maria Gambardella, Artificial Life, Vol. 5, N. 2, 1999.
- Ant Colony System: A Cooperative Learning Approach to the Traveling Salesman Problem. IEEE Transactions on Evolutionary Computation, 1 (1): 53–66. (This became the second most cited paper ever published by IEEE Transactions on Evolutionary Computation.)
