= Stanley and Stella in: Breaking the Ice =

1987 animated short film

- Directed by: Larry Malone
- Produced by: Michael Wahrman
- Music by: Jill Fraser
- Distributed by: Symbolics; Whitney / Demos Productions
- Release date: August 28, 1987
- Running time: 3 minutes
- Country: United States

Stanley and Stella in: Breaking the Ice, also known as Love Found, is a 1987 American animated short film.

== Synopsis ==
Birds and fish are moving around different halves of a sphere, separated by a sheet of ice. One bird and one fish (Stanley and Stella) notice each other and approach their sides of the ice sheet. They look at each other through the ice and twirl to acknowledge that the feeling of love is mutual. Stella looks up and points, Stanley appears to be confused. Stella then taps her side of the ice sheet with her tail. Stanley gazes upward and then nods to her, understanding what he can do. As Stella watches, Stanley flies further and further up until he is high enough and then dives towards the ice sheet, breaking it.

Stella approaches Stanley, who appears to be unconscious, and nudges him awake. He looks around him to see that he is successful and Stella kisses his cheek. As they continue to gaze at each other, the birds and fish around them are shown freely mingling throughout the sphere.

== History ==
=== Original production ===
The animation was created in 1987 by a crew of about 90 people from Symbolics Graphics Division (SGD), Whitney/Demos Productions, and elsewhere. It premiered at the Electronic Theater of SIGGRAPH 1987.

Symbolics undertook the production for two reasons. The first goal was as publicity and marketing for the products of SGD by creating content for submission to SIGGRAPH’s well regarded Electronic Theater. The second goal was to showcase the boids simulation of group motion, an early artificial life model. It was developed in 1986 and 1987 by Craig Reynolds of SGD, and described in a technical paper published at SIGGRAPH 1987

More information about the animation's production can be found in two contemporaneous articles published by SGD. One was printed on the back of the animation's 1987 release poster. That text and a high resolution scan of the poster image can be found on the Internet Archive In March 1988, SGD's newsletter S-News included an article about the animation.

=== Subsequent distribution ===
The film did not gain attention outside the computer graphic field until it was rescored by James Reynolds and edited into the direct to video compilation The Mind's Eye in 1990. In this compilation, the film was retitled as "Love Found", featured a new jazz score, and the credits were eliminated. This version of the film later aired numerous times in the early 1990s on the Canadian television station YTV as part of the "Short Circutz" interludes. Much of Stanley and Stella was later incorporated into a music video, which can still be seen occasionally on MTV, as well as being featured in a few segments of Club Mario.
