= Gerardo Beni =

American academic

Gerardo Beni (born Florence, Italy 21 February 1946) is a professor of electrical engineering at University of California, Riverside who, with Jing Wang, is known as the originator of the term swarm intelligence in the context of cellular robotics and the concept of electrowetting, with Susan Hackwood. He also devised, with Xuan-Li Xie, the Xie–Beni index for measuring the validity of fuzzy clustering.

He is the author of "From Swarm Intelligence to Swarm Robotics" in the book Swarm Robotics

Beni is married to Susan Hackwood. They have two children.

== Education ==
In 1970 Beni was admitted to the Laurea in physics at the University of Florence, Florence, Italy.

In 1974, he received his PhD in theoretical physics at UCLA.

== Academic career ==
Beni has research interests in swarm intelligence, 3D animation, and financial engineering.

Before moving to UC Riverside, he worked at UC Santa Barbara and AT&T Bell Laboratories.

He helped found the Journal of Robotic Systems, and between 1982 and 2005 he was also its director. The journal won the Journal of the Year Award in 1984.

In 1982, Beni was made a Fellow of the American Physical Society. In 1999, he became a Fellow of the AAAS.

== Patents ==
Beni has been issued, either alone or in conjunction with other inventors, several patents from the USPTO:

- Method and apparatus for object positioning while at UC Santa Barbara.
- Object analysis of multi-valued images while at UCSB, together with J Wang.
