= Mark Feinstein =

Linguist

Academic background
- Education: City University of New York (PhD)
- Thesis: Linguistic Nature of Prenasalization (1977)
- Doctoral advisor: Charles Cairns
- Other advisors: Mark Liberman, Alan Stevens, Robert Vago

Academic work
- Discipline: linguistics
- Sub-discipline: phonology

Mark Feinstein is a linguist and professor emeritus of linguistics at Hampshire College. He is known for his works on phonology and evolution of language. While his early research focused on phonology and human sound systems, he now especially focuses on the vocal behavior of non-human animals.
