= Maurice Clerc (mathematician) =

French mathematician

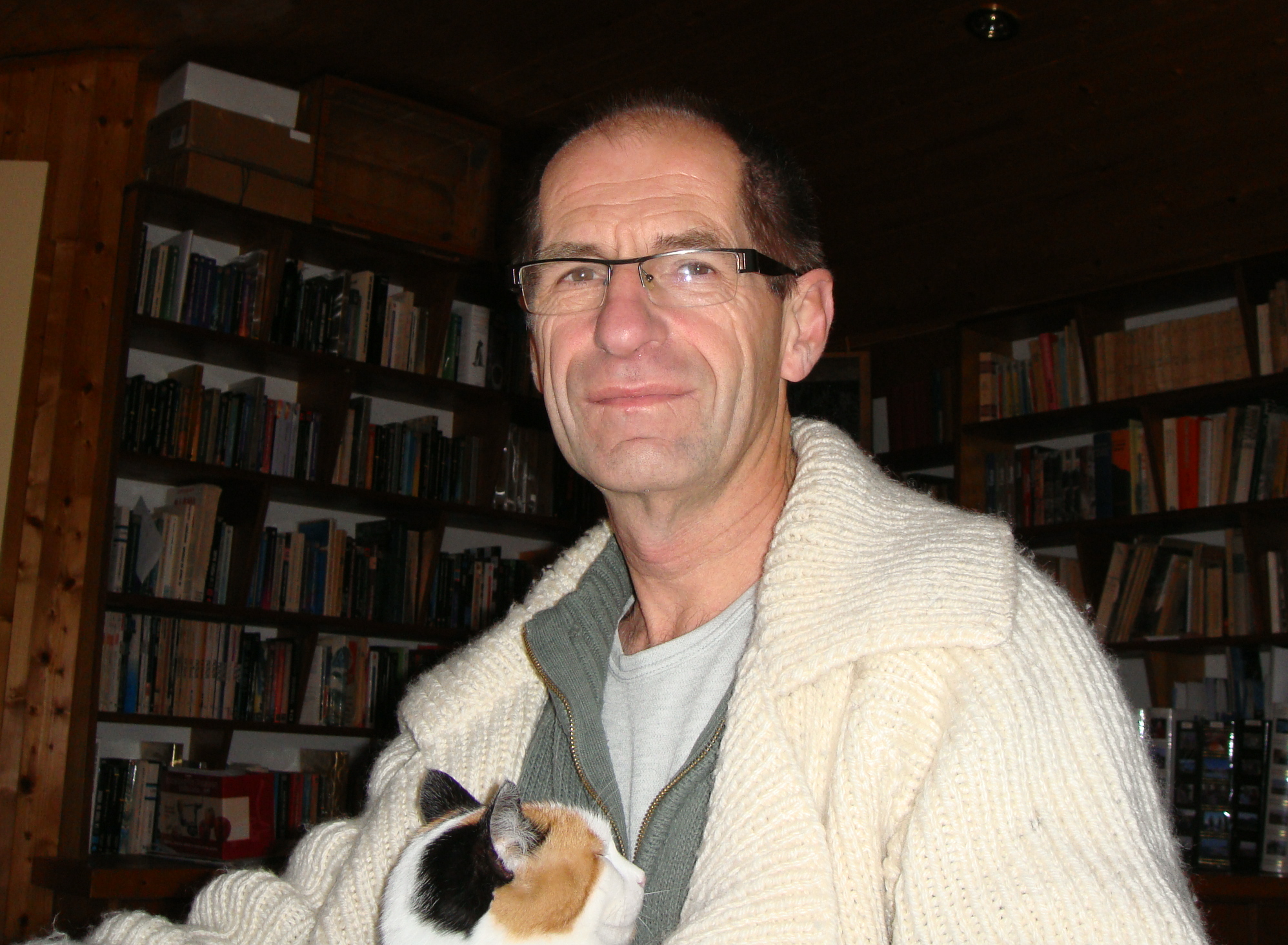
- Born: April 24, 1949 (age 77)
- Occupations: Mathematician and writer

Maurice Clerc is a French mathematician.

== Early life and education ==
Maurice Marcel Clerc was born on April 24, 1949, in Besançon. He finished his graduate studies and obtained his engineering degree in 1972 from the Institut industriel du Nord (renamed Centrale Lille in 1991).

== Professional career ==
Maurice Clerc worked in the Research and Development department of France Télécom.

His early work focused on fuzzy representations. He was later recognized as a world specialist in particle swarm optimization (PSO) jointly with James Kennedy. He is, together with the latter, the lead co-author of the first detailed theoretical analysis of this method, rewarded by IEEE in 2005.

He outlined and demonstrated convergence theorems in a five-dimensional space and, in particular, defined the constriction concept that has since been largely used in the context of PSO.

The analysis defines value intervals for the coefficients, which makes it possible to generalize the algorithm to many types of problems. enabling a researcher or an application developer to use the same model, with the same coefficients, without arbitrary limitation of speeds. One can use the same basic code by just defining the objective function of the problem under consideration. This approach is more versatile than previous ones, and is now used in virtually all PSO variants. By the end of 2020 it got more than a thousand citations.

Clerc introduced other innovations in the swarm intelligence paradigm, for example the «Swarm and Queen» approach.

His work on the use of PSO for combinatorial problems, such as the Travelling Salesman Problem (TSP), is particularly innovative in that he completely redefines the concepts of “speed” and “distance” to address these types of problems.

Its definition of the concept of stagnation and the analysis have also led to improvements in the algorithm.

He works with many people around the world, some notable ones being James Kennedy (see above), Riccardo Poli on the XPS (eXtended Particle Swarms) project of the University of Essex, Patrick Siarry (professor at Paris-East Créteil University), Mahamed G. H. Omran, professor at the Gulf University for Science and Technology (Adaptive Population-based Simplex), and several teacher-researchers in India, including the Indian Institute of Technology (IIT) in Roorkee.

He is involved in updating the Particle Swarm Central site.

Retired since 2004, he remains active in various fields of research, both in PSO related fields and other areas. He regularly publishes articles and books, gives keynote speeches in conferences, and serves as a director and thesis jury. He also occasionally works as an optimization consultant.

== Publications ==
=== Books ===
Maurice Clerc is the author of four books:

- Particle Swarm Optimization
- Guided Randomness in Optimization
- Iterative Optimizers
- Graph Coloring - From Games to Deterministic and Quantum Approaches, Routledge & CRC Press, 2025, 144 p. DOI: 10.1201/9781003477785, ISBN 9781003477785.
- Le □ de l’hypoténuse, Independently Published, 2026, 267 p. (ISBN 979-8251818697).

=== Articles and conference texts ===
- (2001) "Think locally, act locally: The Way of Life of A2PSO, and Adaptive Particle Swarm Optimizer", France Télécom R&D.
- "Stagnation Analysis in Particle Swarm Optimisation or What Happens When Nothing Happens", Technical report, University of Essex, 2006.
- "Why does it work?", International Journal of Computational Intelligence Research 4, n° 2, 2008, p. 79-91.
- "Beyond Standard Particle Swarm Optimisation", International Journal of Swarm Intelligence Research 4, 2010, p. 46-66.
- Handbook of Swarm Intelligence, vol. 8, Heidelberg, Springer, 2011 ISBN 978-3-642-26689-8, "From Theory to Practice in Particle Swarm Optimization", p. 3-36.
- "Cooperation Mechanisms in Particle Swarm Optimisation", Nature Inspired Computing : Theory and Industrial Application, 2013.
- "List Based Optimisers - Experiments and Open Questions", International Journal of Swarm Intelligence Research, vol. 4(4), 2014.
- "Total memory optimiser: proof of concept and compromises", International Journal of Swarm Intelligence, vol. 3, 2017.
