= Animusic =

American animation company

Animusic, LLC
- Formerly: Visual Music
- Type: Private
- Industry: Animation
- Founded: 1990; 36 years ago
- Founder: Wayne Lytle; David Crognale
- Headquarters: Ithaca, New York

Animusic, LLC is a dormant animation company specializing in the 3D visualization of MIDI-based music. Founded by Wayne Lytle in 1990, it is currently a registered limited liability company in New York and had offices in Texas and California during its active stages. The initial name of the company was Visual Music, but was changed to Animusic in 1995.

The company is known for its Animusic compilations of computer-generated animations, based on MIDI events processed to simultaneously drive the music and on-screen action, leading to and corresponding to every sound. The animated short "Pipe Dream," showed at SIGGRAPH's Electronic Theater in 2001, details the use of this specific sequencing.

Unlike many other music visualizations, Animusic uses MIDI information to drive the animation, while other 3D programs animate figures or characters to the music. Any animated models in Animusic are created first, and are then programmed to follow what the music, or MIDI information, instructs them to do.

Many of the instruments appear to be robotic or play themselves using seemingly curious methods to produce and visualize the original compositions. The animations typically feature dramatically lit rooms or landscapes in rustic and/or futuristic locales.

The music in Animusic is principally pop-rock based, consisting of straightforward sequences of triggered samples and digital patches. According to the director's commentary track on Animusic 2, most instrument sounds are generated with software synthesizers on a music workstation. Many sounds resemble stock patches available on digital keyboards, subjected to some manipulation, such as pitch or playback speed, to enhance the appeal of their timbre.

== Releases ==
As of October 2026, three video albums have been released.

- Animusic: A Computer Animation Video Album (2001, re-issued as "special edition" in 2004)
- Animusic 2: A New Computer Animation Video Album (2005)
- Animusic HD: Stunning Computer-Animated Music (2010)

Animusic was released in 2001 on VHS, and later DVD, with a special edition DVD being released later in 2004. This special edition included extra material, such as Animusic's first animation, "Beyond the Walls". A second album, Animusic 2, was released in the United States in 2005. Later, in 2008, this volume received a Japanese localization through a distribution deal with Japanese company Jorudan, Co. Ltd. In a company newsletter, it was announced that the Animusic company would also be producing a high-definition version of Animusic 2 on Blu-ray, to be released sometime before their third major album, Animusic 3. This HD compilation was eventually released in November 2010, featuring all of the animations featured in Animusic 2, as well as the animation "Pipe Dream" from Animusic encoded at a high bitrate. In a later newsletter, the working titles of three animations in Animusic 3, “Sonic Warfare”, “Paddle Ball” and “Super Pipe Dream”, were revealed. In 2012, a Kickstarter campaign for Animusic 3 was successfully funded. "The Sound of Twelve," a music-only album made using similar harmonics as Animusic, was released in March 2015. Animusic 3 was never finished or released.

In the mid-2000s, a viral hoax email suggested that the "Pipe Dream" video was actually a machine created at the University of Iowa from farm machinery parts. Although this has been proven false, the hoax was still considered "pretty amusing" to the Animusic staff. It is currently unknown who started the hoax. Intel later commissioned a version of the machine to be built which was demonstrated at IDF 2011.

=== Animusic 3 ===
Animusic, in its former state with multiple employees, was working on the third volume of the Animusic series for over 10 years. It was initially intended to be released sometime in 2010, featuring animations such as "Sonic Warfare", "Paddle Ball", and "Super Pipe Dream". However, this release date passed with no definitive word regarding the volume's progress. A year later in November 2010, Animusic attributed this delay to a complete restructuring of their modeling and rendering software, ultimately yielding the Animusic|Studio software program.

On August 6, 2012, the company began a Kickstarter campaign aimed at raising $200,000 USD to fund the completion of the Animusic 3. This campaign was featured on several websites such as Animation World Network. A rough mix from the newly revealed music album The Sound of 12, titled "Glarpedge," was released online on August 28, 2012. On August 31, 2012, two more mixes were released: "Emoticondria" and "EchoKrunch." The Kickstarter page was later updated to confirm that a Blu-ray edition of Animusic 3 would be released shortly following the DVD's completion.

On September 5, 2012, the Kickstarter campaign ended successfully, with a final backing amount of $223,123. Animusic posted expected shipping dates of October 2013 for the DVD, and February 2014 for the Blu-ray disc. However, both dates passed without either product being released.

On a Kickstarter update in August 2015, Wayne Lytle announced some other factors that have delayed the project, including Dave Crognale's departure from the project and new residence in California, personal struggles, and physical stress and injury. To make up for this, the team utilized the distribution of supplemental prizes for backers to try and ease those who had funded the campaign, and assure them that there would be a quick resolution. Lytle had noted in this particular update that his financial situation was so unfortunate to the point where he, his mother and father, and his wife were unable to pay for shipping postage for the remainder of the inventory. However, Lytle insisted on his determination to finish the project, expressing his excitement about the abilities of the newly implemented Unreal Engine 4 and his gratitude for those who have invested in him. Lytle stated that he had withheld from posting an update until he had a completion date, but did not give one in the update.

"With that said, I do want to again thank all of you for being with us along this much-longer-than-anticipated journey. I do not take your support lightly! I wish the production had progressed way more quickly, yet here we are. Disappointing people is not something I enjoy! At all. I truly believe that God created me and put me here on earth to bring joy to people...through music in general, Animusic most specifically. That’s my mission, and that’s what I will do."

— Wayne

Since the 2015 Kickstarter update, no further updates have been posted on the platform. In August 2017, the Animusic headquarters was sold to RP Solutions, Inc.

In August 2019, the Animusic website was briefly taken down, and replaced by a generic template with a small explanation that the site is undergoing a redesign.

According to the New York State Division of Corporations, State Records, and UCC, Animusic is still an active domestic limited liability company and is registered to an address in Cortland, New York. The status of Wayne Lytle is publicly unknown; however, the Cortland property that the limited liability company is registered under has been sold as of November 2021. In August 2025, the subscription for Animusic's website domain was not renewed and is not online as of June 2026.

== Software programs ==
According to the company's FAQ, animation is created procedurally with their own proprietary MIDImotion engine. Discreet 3D Studio Max was used for modeling, lighting, cameras, and rendering. Maps were painted with Corel Painter, Deep Paint 3D, and Photoshop. They have also created their own software called ANIMUSIC studio that is based on scene-graph technology. According to an August 2015 newsletter, Animusic was using Unreal Engine 4 for the production of Animusic 3.

== Animations ==
- Various animations for SIGGRAPH
- More Bells and Whistles (1990) – made by Wayne Lytle before creating Animusic
- Beyond the Walls (known as Concerto in 3D if watched in stereoscopic 3D) (1996) – the first animation made under the name of Animusic, produced for VRex (a manufacturer of stereoscopic glasses and projectors). This animation is included as a bonus feature on the Animusic special edition DVD.
- Kansas – Device, Voice, Drum (2002) – animation for an intro to the band's concert and a music-only bridge in one of the tracks "Miracles Out of Nowhere"; album cover. This animation incorporates several instruments from the first album, including the drum kit from Future Retro and the bass guitar tower from Harmonic Voltage.

=== Animusic: A Computer Animation Video Album ===
Animusic: Video Album Soundtrack

Soundtrack album by Animusic
- Released: 2001
- Genres: Progressive rock, Soundtrack
- Length: 48:37
- Label: Animusic

Tracklist:

1. "Future Retro" – 4:24
2. "Stick Figures" – 5:23
3. "Aqua Harp" – 3:47
4. "Drum Machine" – 3:22
5. "Pipe Dream" – 3:22
6. "Acoustic Curves" – 5:32
7. "Harmonic Voltage" – 6:46
8. "Seventh Alloy" (Not animated) – 4:27
9. "A Slight Delay" (Not animated) – 6:07
10. "The Harvester" (Not animated) – 5:40

=== Animusic 2: A New Computer Animation Video Album ===
Animusic 2: Video Album Soundtrack

Soundtrack album by Animusic
- Released: 2005
- Genre: Soundtrack
- Length: 49:11
- Label: Animusic

Tracklist:

1. "Starship Groove" – 3:49
2. "Pogo Sticks" – 3:17
3. "Resonant Chamber" – 4:20
4. "Cathedral Pictures" – 6:00
5. "Pipe Dream 2" – 4:01
6. "Fiber Bundles" – 5:13
7. "Gyro Drums" – 3:51
8. "Heavy Light" – 6:24

==== Animusic 2 CD bonus tracks ====
The bonus audio tracks on this CD consist of reduced versions of "Heavy Light" and "Fiber Bundles":

1. "Heavy Light" (Drum/Bass Submix) – 2:30
2. "Fiber Bundles" (Drum/Bass Submix) – 4:25
3. "Fiber Bundles" (Synth/Ambient Submix) – 5:04
