= Luca Maria Gambardella =

Italian computer scientist and author (born 1962)

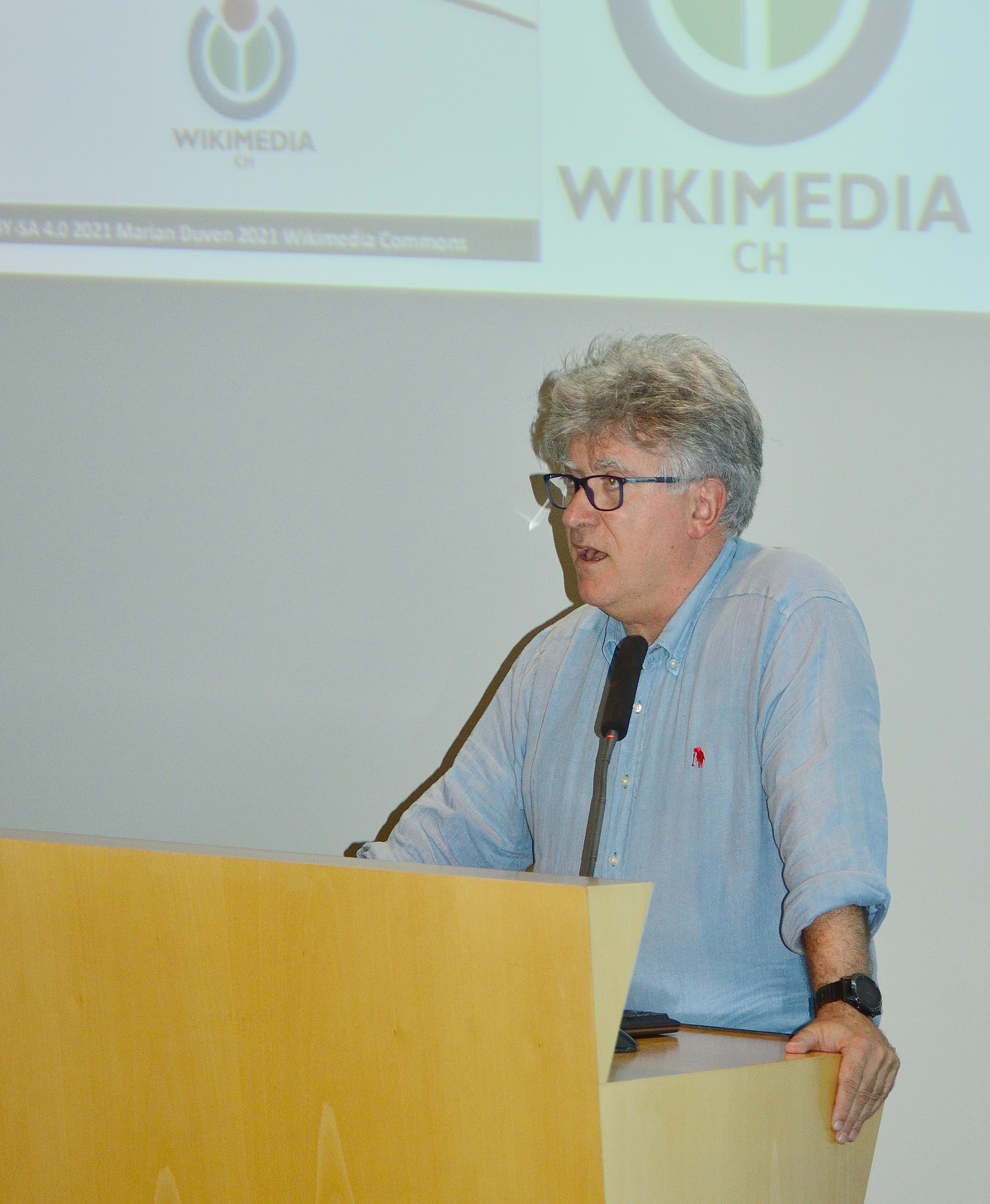
- Born: 4 January 1962 (age 64); Saronno, Italy
- Scientific career
- Fields: Artificial intelligence
- Workplaces: Istituto Dalle Molle di Studi sull'Intelligenza Artificiale
- Website: people.idsia.ch/~luca

Luca Maria Gambardella (born 4 January 1962) is an Italian computer scientist and author. He is the former director of the Dalle Molle Institute for Artificial Intelligence Research in Lugano, in the Ticino canton of Switzerland. He is currently the prorector of Università della Svizzera italiana, where he directs the Master of Science in Artificial Intelligence degree course.

Several of his papers have been extensively cited, with his collaborators including Marco Dorigo, with whom he has published papers on the application of ant colony optimization theory to the traveling salesman problem, and Jürgen Schmidhuber with whom he has published research on deep neural networks..

Beside working in research, Gambardella explores the potentials of AI applied for the generation of art. Some of his artistic installations received significant media coverage. As a novelist, the genres he approached broad from Bildungsroman of his first book "Sei vite" ("Six lives"), to romance of his second book "Il suono dell'alba" ("The sound of sunrise").
