= California Council on Science and Technology =

The California Council on Science and Technology (CCST) is an independent, not-for-profit 501(c)(3) organization designed to offer expert advice to the California state government and to recommend solutions to science and technology-related policy issues. CCST is modeled after the National Academies - the official scholarly body serving the United States of America - to provide the State of California with a parallel network of institutional and individual advisors.

== History ==
CCST was founded during a period of heightened concern about California's future following the loss of several national competitions for important research facilities. It was established via Assembly Concurrent Resolution (ACR 162) in 1988 by a unanimous vote of the California Legislature, charged to "report to [university] presidents... and respond to the Governor, the Legislature, and other entities on public policy issues related to science and technology." The first CCST meetings took place in 1989.

Core support was initially provided by five institutions of higher education specified in the ACR (the University of California, California State University, Stanford University, Caltech, and the University of Southern California). In 1994, the California Community College System joined as a sustaining institution. In 2005, six of the largest federal funded laboratories in California joined as affiliate members Lawrence Berkeley National Laboratory, Lawrence Livermore National Laboratory, Sandia National Laboratories/California, SLAC National Accelerator Laboratory, NASA Jet Propulsion Laboratory, and the NASA Ames Research Center).

Since its founding, CCST has worked on an ever-increasing number and variety of projects including energy research, science and math education, intellectual property policy, biotechnology, and nanotechnology, among others. It has also collaborated extensively with the National Academies and worked to make a variety of national reports produced by the Academies more accessible to state policy makers.

CCST has had two executive directors to date: Donald Shields (1989–1995), former president of Southern Methodist University and Susan Hackwood, professor of Electrical Engineering at the University of California, Riverside (1995–2018).

== Organization ==
The founding legislation incorporated two key ideas. First, it called for the council to consist of experts from business as well as from the educational sector. Second, CCST was funded in a way that was both sustainable and independent from government.

CCST is governed by a Board of Directors composed of distinguished leaders from academia and industry, representing members of its sustaining institutions and Federal Laboratories, from the corporate and business community, as well as from the philanthropic community. The CCST Board is assisted by a larger CCST Council, a larger group of corporate CEOs, academicians, and scientists that provides advice in their areas of expertise. As of 2017, there are also 137 CCST Senior Fellows who are available to provide expert advice as needed. Seventy-six members and fellows are also members of the National Academies, six are Nobel laureates, nine are National Medal of Science recipients and two are recipients of the National Medal of Technology.

CCST implements additional programs when it identifies unmet needs at the intersection of science and policy in the state of California. Current programs include:

- The Science & Technology Policy Fellows. Each year CCST trains and mentors up to 10 scientists and engineers in the policymaking process, than places them alongside staffers in California Assembly and Senate offices. These PhD-level experts experience a year of public service and leadership training, and get the chance to explore a career in California's policy arena.
- California Teacher Advisory Council (Cal TAC). A group of 12 master teachers who provide a valuable connection between the teaching community and the educational experts and policymakers who are shaping California's educational system.
- Federal Laboratory Affiliates in California. CCST represents Federal Laboratory Affiliates, helping State leaders identify and solicit expertise from Federal research institutions located in California to inform their policy priorities.
- Science and State Policy Beyond California. A network of similar organizations which provide independent scientific advice in other states. CCST shares materials and resources with these partners and interfaces with relevant national organizations as appropriate.
