= Bedrich Benes =

American-Czech computer scientist (born 1967)

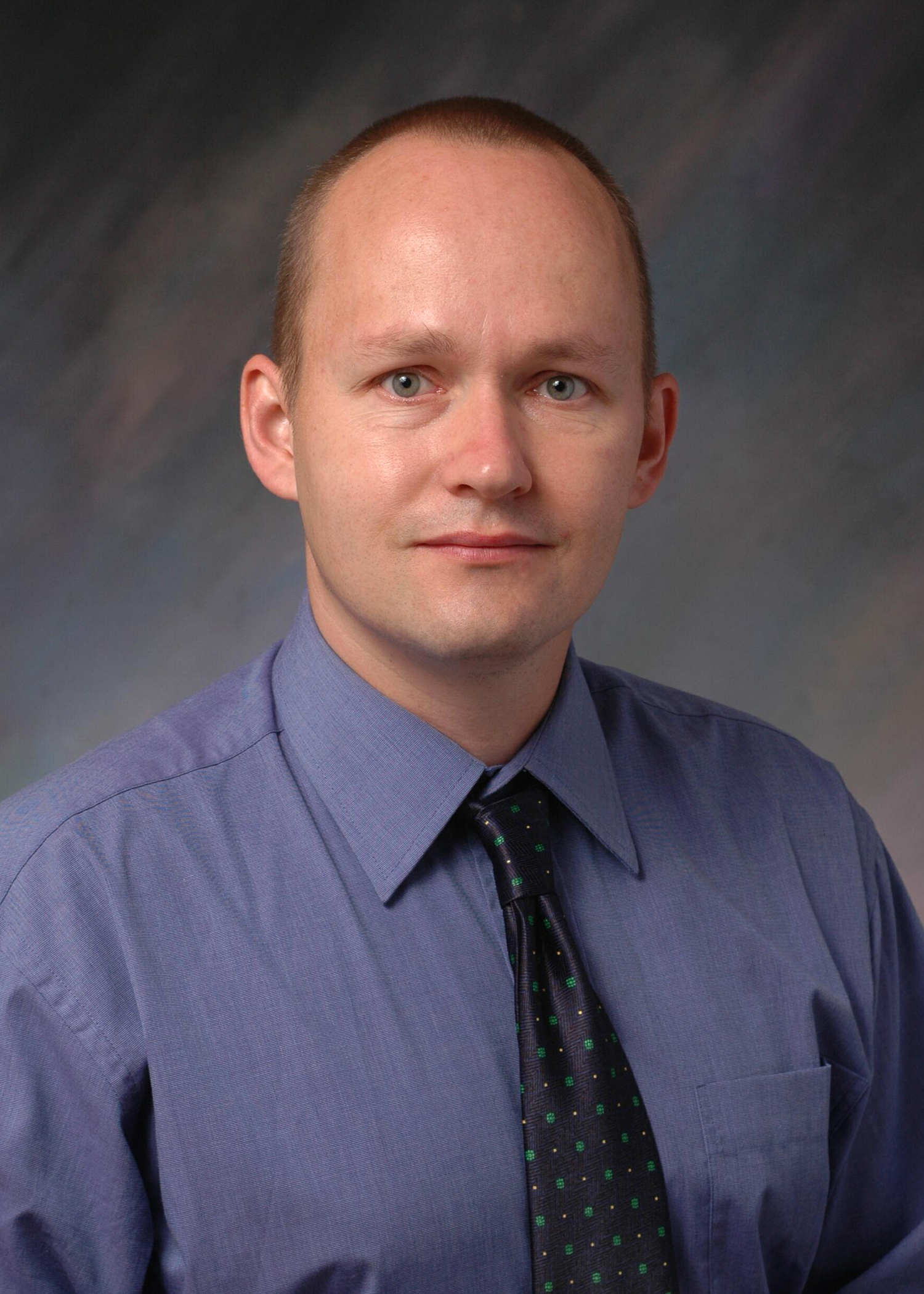
- Bedrich Benes in 2005
- Born: Bedřich Beneš; 10 November 1967 (age 58); Most, Czechoslovakia
- Education: Czech Technical University
- Known for: Computer science, computer graphics
- Scientific career
- Fields: Computer graphics Computer science Geometric modeling
- Workplaces: Purdue University; Monterrey Institute of Technology and Higher Education

Bedrich Benes (born Bedřich Beneš 10 November 1967) is an American-Czech computer scientist and a researcher in computer graphics.

== Academic positions ==
He is a professor and associate head of computer science at Purdue University. He was a member of numerous program committees of various conferences, including ACM SIGGRAPH and Eurographics and he was a papers chair of Eurographics 2017. Dr. Benes is editor-in-chief of Graphical Models journal and he was editor-in-chief of Computer Graphics Forum (2018–2021). He is associate editor of Computers & Graphics., IEEE Transactions on Games, and in Silico Plants. He worked at Purdue Computer Graphics Technology from 2005-2021, where he held a named professorship (George W. McNelly Professor of Technology in 2019-2021). He is known for his work in geometric modeling, procedural modeling, scientific visualization, and software optimizations in digital manufacturing.

== Education ==
Benes received his Ph.D. in 1998 from Czech Technical University where he studied computer science and computer graphics and his M.S. degree in 1991 from the same institution in the same fields.

== Honors and awards ==
- 2022 Eurographics Fellow
- 2020 Elsevier Computers & Graphics Associate Editor of the Year 2020
- 2019 - 2022 Purdue University George W. McNelly Professor of Technology
- 2019 Association for Computing Machinery (ACM) Senior Member
- 2018–2021 Computer Graphics Forum Editor in Chief
- 2017 Institute of Electrical and Electronics Engineers (IEEE) Senior Member
- 2017 Eurographics Annual Conference - honorable mention from the Best Papers Committee for the paper " Interactive Modeling and Authoring of Climbing Plants"
- 2017 Eurographics Annual Conference Papers Chair
- 2012 Purdue University Outstanding Award in Discovery
- 2011 Purdue University Faculty Scholar
- 2011 Purdue University Outstanding Award in Discovery
- 2009 Purdue University Early Faculty Discovery Award
- 2005 Outstanding faculty award in discovery and technical development (Premio Rómulo Garza) of Monterrey Institute of Technology and Higher Education

== Books ==
- Jiří Žára, Bedřich Beneš, Jiří Sochor, Petr Felkel (1998) "Moderní počítačová grafika" (Computer press)
- George Bebis, Richard Boyle, Bahram Parvin, Darko Koracin, Song Wang, Kim Kyungnam, Bedrich Benes, Stephen DiVerdi, Kenneth Moreland, Chiang Yi-Jen, Christoph Borst and Jiang Ming editors (2006) "Advances in Visual Computing: 7th International Symposium", Springer-Verlag Lecture Notes in Computer Science

== Selected works ==
- Pauli, D., Huppenthal, B., Wang, D., Schnable, J., & Benes, B. (2026). Digital twins for plant and crop improvement. Trends in Plant Science.
- Vazquez, J., Yang, S., Zhang, Y., Demieville, J., Huppenthal, B., Merchant, N., Popescu, V., Magana, A., Pauli, D., & Benes, B. (2026). VR BioTalk—Hands-Free Visual Analytics of Phenotyping Data Using Natural Conversation. IEEE Access, 14, 75577–75592.
- Davis, J. M., Gaillard, M., Tross, M. C., Shrestha, N., Ostermann, I., Grove, R. J., Li, B., Benes, B., & Schnable, J. C. (2025). 3D Reconstruction Enables High-Throughput Phenotyping and Quantitative Genetic Analysis of Phyllotaxy. Plant Phenomics, 7(1), 100023.
- Lee, J. J., Li, B., & Benes, B. (2024). Latent L-Systems: Transformer-Based Tree Generator. ACM Transactions on Graphics (TOG), 43(1).
- Li, B., Klein, J., Michels, D. L., Pirk, S., Benes, B., & Palubicki, W. (2023). Rhizomorph: The Coordinated Function of Shoots and Roots. ACM Transaction on Graphics, 42(4).
- Zhou, X., Li, B., Benes, B., Fei, S., & Pirk, S. (2023). DeepTree: Modeling Trees with Situated Latents. IEEE Transactions on Visualization & Computer Graphics, 01, 1–14.
- Niese, T., Pirk, S., Albrecht, M., Benes, B., & Deussen, O. (2022). Procedural Urban Forestry. ACM Transaction on Graphics, 41(2).
- Li, B., Kałużny, J., Klein, J., Michels, D. L., Pałubicki, W., Benes, B., & Pirk, S. (2021). Learning to Reconstruct Botanical Trees from Single Images. ACM Transaction on Graphics, 40(6), 1–15.
- Guo, J., Jiang, H., Benes, B., Deussen, O., Zhang, X., Lischinski, D., & Huang, H. (2020). Inverse Procedural Modeling of Branching Structures by Inferring L-Systems. ACM Transactions on Graphics (TOG)
- Benes, B., Guan, K., Lang, M., Long, S. P., Lynch, J. P., Marshall-Colón, A., Bin, P., Schnable, J., Sweetlove, L.J., & Turk, M. J. (2020). Multiscale computational models can guide experimentation and targeted measurements for crop improvement. The Plant Journal
- Graciano, A., Rueda-Ruiz, A. J., Pospisil, A., Bittner, J., & Benes, B. (2020). QuadStack: An Efficient Representation and Direct Rendering of Layered Datasets. IEEE Transactions on Visualization and Computer Graphics
- Kang, H., Li, H., Zhang, J., Lu, X., & Benes, B. (2018). Flycam: Multitouch gesture controlled drone gimbal photography. IEEE Robotics and Automation Letters, 3(4), 3717-3724
- Hädrich, T., Benes, B., Deussen, O., and Pirk, S (2017) Interactive Modeling and Authoring of Climbing Plants in Computer Graphics Forum (Eurographics 2017 - honorable mention from the Best Papers Committee)
- Gen Nishida, Ignacio Garcia-Dorado, Daniel G Aliaga, Bedrich Benes and Adrien Bousseau (2016) "Interactive sketching of urban procedural models" in ACM Transactions on Graphics (TOG)
- Soren Pirk, Ondřej Šťáva, Julian Kratt, Michel Abdul Massih Said, Boris Neubert, Radomir Mech, Bedrich Benes and Oliver Deussen (2012), "Plastic trees: interactive self-adapting botanical tree models" in ACM Transactions on Graphics
- Ondřej Šťáva, Juraj Vaněk, Bedřich Beneš, Nathan Carr and Radomír Měch (2012), "Stress relief: improving structural strength of 3D printable objects", in ACM Transactions on Graphics (TOG) 31(4)
- Carlos A Vanegas, Daniel G. Aliaga, Bedrich Benes (2010), "Building reconstruction using manhattan-world grammars" IEEE Conference on Computer Vision and Pattern Recognition (CVPR)
- Ondřej Šťáva, Bedřich Beneš, Radomír Měch, Daniel G. Aliaga, and Peter Krištof (2010), "Inverse Procedural Modeling by Automatic Generation of L-systems" in Computer Graphics Forum
- Peter Krištof, Bedřich Beneš, Jan Křivánek and Ondřej Šťáva (2009), "Hydraulic erosion using smoothed particle hydrodynamics", in Computer Graphics Forum
- Christopher Hartman and Bedrich Benes (2006), "Autonomous Boids" in Computer Animation and Virtual Worlds
- Bedrich Benes and Rafael Forsbach (2001), "Layered data representation for visual simulation of terrain erosion", in Spring Conference on Computer Graphics (IEEE)
