= Craig Reynolds (computer graphics) =

American computer graphics expert (born 1953)

Craig W. Reynolds (born March 15, 1953), is an artificial life and computer graphics expert. He created the Boids artificial life simulation in 1986, introducing one the first models from flocking. Reynolds worked on the film Tron (1982) as a scene programmer, and on Batman Returns (1992) as part of the video image crew. Reynolds won the 1998 Academy Scientific and Technical Award in recognition of "his pioneering contributions to the development of three-dimensional computer animation for motion picture production." In 2023 at the ALIFE conference he won the lifetime achievement award of the International society for Artificial Life (ISAL). He is the author of the OpenSteer library.
