= Jeremiah Hayes =

Jeremiah Hayes may refer to:

- Jeremiah Hayes (filmmaker), Canadian film editor and director
- Jeremiah F. Hayes, professor of electrical engineering
