= Yuhui Shi =

Chinese electrical engineer

Yuhui Shi is a pioneer in particle swarm optimization algorithms and the developer of brain storm optimization algorithms. He was an electrical engineer from Xi'an Jiaotong-Liverpool University in Suzhou, China, where he was named a Fellow of the Institute of Electrical and Electronics Engineers (IEEE) in 2016 for his contributions to particle swarm optimization algorithms. He earned his PhD in electrical engineering from Southeast University, Nanjing, China in 1992, and was trained as a Post Doc Fellow at Concordia University under Canadian International Development Agency joint doctoral program, initiated by Prof. Jeremiah F. Hayes et al. He organized the first IEEE Symposium on Swarm Intelligence in 2003, and established the IEEE CIS (Computational Intelligence Society) Task Force on Swarm Intelligence in 2002, when he co-authored a book with James Kennedy (social psychologist) and Russell C. Eberhart. He is a Chair Professor in the Department of Computer Science and Engineering, Southern University of Science and Technology (SUSTech), Shenzhen, China, where he invited Prof. Jun (Steed) Huang, from the Joint Institutes of Carleton University and the University of Ottawa, for a collaboration on swarm intelligence robotics.
