= The Choir Boys =

2000 Canadian documentary film

- French: Enfants de chœur !
- Directed by: Magnus Isacsson
- Written by: Magnus Isacsson; François Renaud
- Produced by: Paul Lapointe
- Cinematography: François Beauchemin; Martin Duckworth; Andrei Khabad; Ali Reggab; Michael Wees
- Edited by: Louise Côté
- Release date: June 6, 1999
- Running time: 76 minutes
- Country: Canada
- Languages: English; French

The Choir Boys (French: Enfants de chœur !) is a Canadian documentary film, directed by Magnus Isacsson and released in 1999. The film profiles the Chorale de L'Accueil Bonneau, a group of homeless men from Montreal who have formed a choir under the leadership of Pierre Anthian.

The film premiered on June 6, 1999, as an episode of Radio-Canada's arts anthology series Les Beaux Dimanches, and was subsequently screened at various film festivals.

The film was a Jutra Award nominee for Best Documentary Film at the 2nd Jutra Awards in 2000.
