= Maxime, McDuff & McDo =

2002 documentary film directed by Magnus Isacsson

- Directed by: Magnus Isacsson
- Produced by: Monique Simard and Marcel Simard
- Edited by: Louise Côté
- Music by: Robert Marcel Lepage
- Release date: 2002
- Running time: 52 minutes
- Country: Canada
- Language: French

Maxime, McDuff & McDo is a 2002 documentary film by Magnus Isacsson that shows the attempt to unionize a McDonald's restaurant in Montreal, Quebec, Canada. They were successful, but McDonald's quickly shut down the franchise after the union affiliated to Confédération des syndicats nationaux won.

== See also ==
- McLibel case
- McJob
- Fast Food Nation (film)
