= Power (1996 film) =

1996 Canadian documentary film

- Directed by: Magnus Isacsson
- Written by: Magnus Isacsson; Glen Salzman
- Produced by: Don Haig; Glen Salzman; Mark Zannis
- Edited by: Susan Shanks
- Music by: Mark Korven
- Production companies: National Film Board of Canada; Cineflix
- Release date: September 11, 1996 (TIFF)
- Running time: 80 minutes
- Country: Canada
- Language: English

Power is a 1996 Canadian documentary film directed by Magnus Isacsson. The film portrays the efforts of the Cree and Inuit of Nord-du-Québec to campaign against the hydroelectricity project on the Great Whale River.

The film premiered in the Perspective Canada program at the 1996 Toronto International Film Festival.

The film received a Genie Award nomination for Best Feature Length Documentary at the 17th Genie Awards.
