= No More Hiroshima =

No More Hiroshima is a 1984 National Film Board of Canada documentary about two survivors of the 1945 atomic bomb attack on Hiroshima, who are among a small group of Japanese who risk ostracism in their country by identifying themselves as hibakusha: survivors of the atomic bombings of Hiroshima and Nagasaki. The 26-minute documentary by Martin Duckworth follows the survivors on their mission to New York City as part of the Japanese peace movement at the second United Nations Special Session on Disarmament held in June, 1982. This 26 minute film received the Genie Award for Best Short Documentary at the 7th Genie Awards.

The idea for the film was originally suggested by Duckworth's father-in-law, an historian and activist who was in touch with the peace movement in Japan.
