= Martin Duckworth =

Canadian director (born 1933)

- Born: March 8, 1933 (age 92); Canada
- Occupations: Director; Cinematographer

Martin Duckworth (born March 8, 1933) is a Canadian documentary director and cinematographer who was on staff at the National Film Board from 1963 to 1970 and has continued to work with them as a freelance filmmaker. He was cinematographer on more than 100 films, and directed or co-directed 30, most of them with the NFB.

His credits as director include 12,000 Men and Return to Dresden (Golden Sheaf awards at Yorkton, 1979 and 1986), A Wives' Tale (Quebec Critics’ Choice 1980), No More Hiroshima (Genie 1984), Our Last Days in Moscow (best direction FIFA1987), Oliver Jones in Africa (Mannheim Ducate 1990), and Brush with Life (Hot Docs Best Film 1994).

His cinematography work has included Christopher's Movie Matinée, directed by Mort Ransen (1968), Sad Song of Yellow Skin, by Michael Rubbo (1970), Le bonhomme, by Pierre Maheu (1972), La richesse des autres, by Maurice Bulbulian (1973), Falasha by Peter Raymont (1983), La bombe en bonus, by Audrey Schirmer (1986), Between Two Worlds by Barry Greenwald (1990), Seeing Red by Julia Reichert (1993), Maureen Forrester, the Diva in Winter, by Donald Winkler (1999), Return to Kandahar by Paul Jay (2003), Professor Norman Cornett, by Alanis Obomsawin (2009), My Real Life (Ma vie réelle), by Magnus Isacsson (2012), Granny Power, by Jocelyn Clarke (2016). He has also worked as a cinematographer with such filmmakers as Gilles Groulx, Don Shebib and Peter Watkins

He narrated the opening monologue of the song "The Dead Flag Blues" by Godspeed You! Black Emperor.

From 1990 to 2012, he taught film at Concordia University's Mel Hoppenheim School of Cinema.

In 2015, he was awarded the Government of Quebec's Prix Albert-Tessier, given to individuals for an outstanding career in Quebec cinema.

== Personal life ==
He is a descendant of Nicholas Austin, one of the first Quakers in the province of Quebec and the founder of Austin, Quebec. Duckworth was raised in Montreal's Notre-Dame-de-Grâce neighbourhood. He went to high school in Halifax, Nova Scotia, and attended Yale University and the University of Toronto for BA and MA degrees in history.

His father, Jack Duckworth, was secretary-general of the YMCAs in NDG and Halifax. His mother, Muriel Duckworth was a distinguished Canadian pacifist and activist. He was married to Audrey Schirmer, a photographer and filmmaker, with whom he has collaborated on a range of projects. They had three children together, Nicholas, Jacqueline and Danielle. Duckworth is also the father of twins from his first marriage, Marya and Sylvia, as well as daughters Natascha and Anana from his second marriage.

His relationship with Schirmer, as she struggled with Alzheimer-related dementia prior to her death in 2019, was the subject of Jeremiah Hayes's 2021 documentary film Dear Audrey.
