= Brain storm optimization algorithm =

The brain storm optimization algorithm is a heuristic algorithm that focuses on solving multi-modal problems, such as radio antennas design worked on by Yahya Rahmat-Samii, inspired by the brainstorming process, proposed by Dr. Yuhui Shi.

More than 200 papers related to BSO algorithms have appeared in various journals and conferences. There have also been special issues and special sessions on Brain Storm Optimization algorithm in journals and various conferences, such as Memetic Computing Journal.

There are a number of variants of the algorithms as well, such as Hypo Variance Brain Storm Optimization, where the object function evaluation is based on the hypo or sub variance rather than Gaussian variance, and Global-best Brain Storm Optimization, where the global-best incorporates a re-initialization scheme that is triggered by the current state of the population, combined with per-variable updates and fitness-based grouping.

Carleton University researchers proposed another variant by using a periodic quantum learning strategy to provides new momentum, enabling individuals to escape local optima (local optimum).

A number of comparison studies are conducted between PSO and BSO. Recently published book contains much more up to date references. It was used to design 5G network as well.
