= My Real Life =

- French: Ma vie réelle
- Directed by: Magnus Isacsson
- Written by: Magnus Isacsson
- Produced by: Jeannine Gagné
- Starring: Alexandre Bryson; Don Karnage; Danny Raymond; Michael Stiverne; Mikerson Stiverne
- Cinematography: Martin Duckworth
- Edited by: Annie Jean
- Production company: Les Films du 3 mars
- Release date: November 11, 2012 (RIDM)
- Running time: 75 minutes
- Country: Canada
- Language: French

My Real Life (French: Ma vie réelle) is a Canadian documentary film, directed by Magnus Isacsson and released in 2012. The last film Isacsson completed before his death, the film centres on the experiences of four young men in suburban Montréal-Nord who have turned to hip hop music as a creative outlet.

The film premiered at the 2012 Montreal International Documentary Festival, where it was the winner of the Grand Prize for Best National Feature. Due to Isacsson's death in August, it was screened as part of a tribute retrospective of several of his films at the Cinémathèque québécoise. The festival also announced the creation of the Magnus Isacsson Award, to honour Canadian films with a strong social message, in the same year.

The film was a Jutra Award nominee for Best Documentary Film at the 15th Jutra Awards in 2013.

It was released on DVD in 2013.
