= Jeremiah Hayes (filmmaker) =

Canadian film director, writer and editor

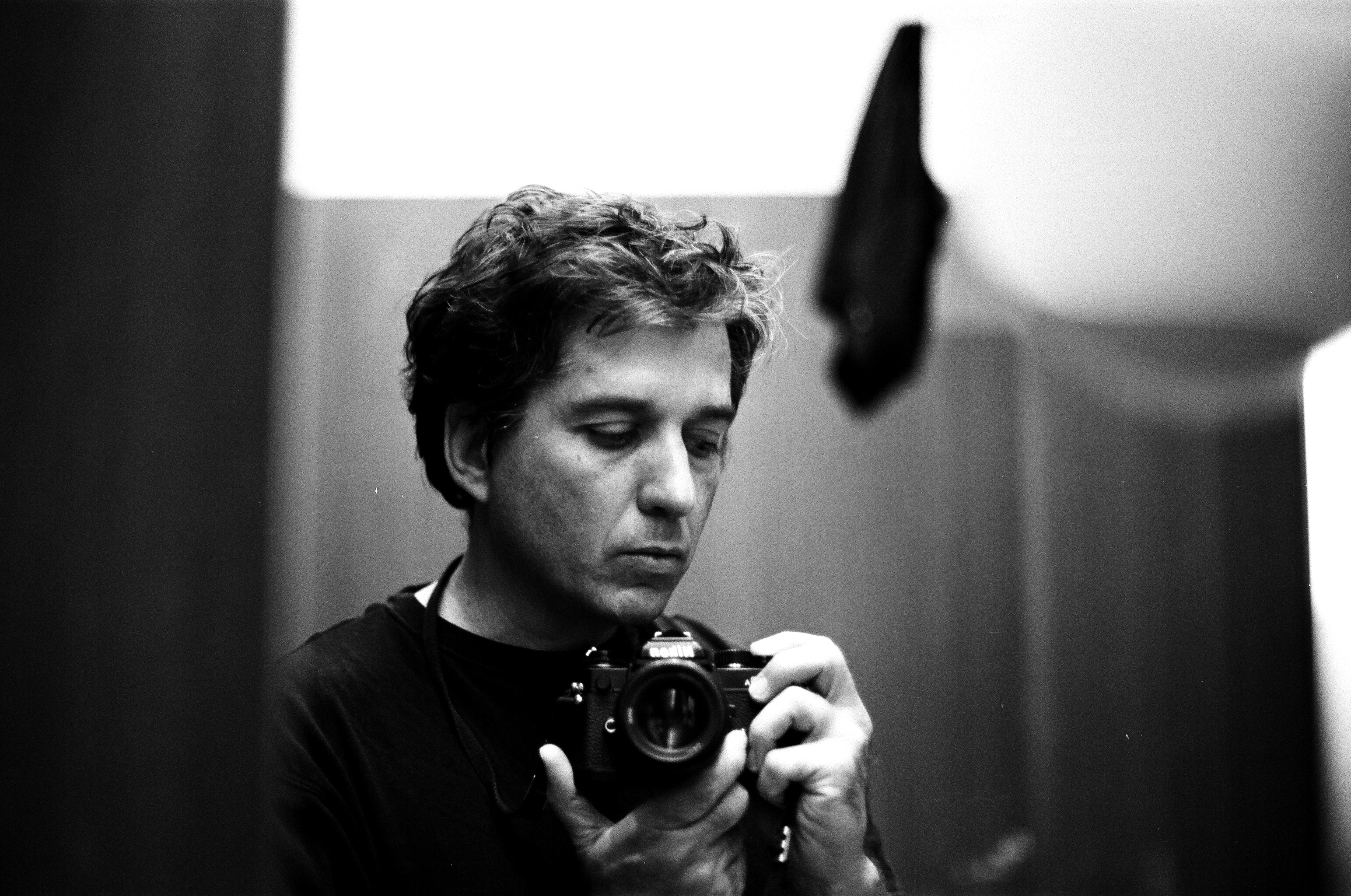
Jeremiah Hayes

Jeremiah Hayes is a Canadian film director, writer, and editor. He is known for being the co-director, co-writer, and the editor of the 2010 documentary Reel Injun.

== Early life and education ==
Jeremiah Hayes was born in Walnut Creek, California, the son of Jeremiah F. Hayes who is recognized in the field of electrical engineering.

He graduated with a Bachelor of Fine Arts (BFA) in Film Production at Concordia University Montreal in 1990.

== Career ==
Hayes is a Canadian film director, writer, and editor. He was the co-director, co-writer, and the editor of the documentary Reel Injun, which was awarded a Gemini Award in 2010 for Best Direction in a Documentary Program. In 2011, Reel Injun won a Peabody Award for Best Electronic Media. Hayes was the co-editor of Rumble: The Indians Who Rocked the World, which was awarded a Canadian Screen Award for Best Editing in a Documentary in 2018. In 2018, Rumble won a Canadian Screen Award for Best Feature Length Documentary, and in 2017 Rumble won the Special Jury Award for Masterful Storytelling at the Sundance Film Festival in 2017. In 2020, Rumble received an Emmy Award nomination for Outstanding Arts & Culture Documentary. In 2021, Reel Injun is featured in the Academy Museum of Motion Pictures core exhibition of the Stories of Cinema.

In 2021, Jeremiah directed Dear Audrey. Dear Audrey is about the life of Canadian filmmaker Martin Duckworth, and his wife Audrey Schirmer's struggle with Alzheimer's. It is produced by SwingDog Films, Cineflix Media Inc, The National Film Board of Canada, and the Super Channel.

In 1991, while working at The National Film Board of Canada, Hayes first met Duckworth when he was working as the assistant editor on Duckworth`s documentary entitled Peacekeepers at War.

In 2016, Hayes begain to film Duckworth and his wife Audrey Schirmer in their Montreal apartment in order to make the documentary Dear Audrey. Hayes filmed the couple for four years, over 50 shooting days, gathering 90 hours of footage, which included 15 hours of interviews with Duckworth.

The film Dear Audrey won the following awards: Two Iris Awards for Best Feature Documentary and Best Editing of a Feature Documentary at the 2023 Gala du Quebec Cinema.The People's Choice Award at the Montreal International Documentary Festival (RIDM) (2021), the Best Feature Documentary Award at the Indy Film Fest (2022), the Cercle d’or for Best Feature Documentary Award at the Sherbrooke World Film Festival (2022), Silver Award for Best Feature Documentary at the Tokyo Film Awards (2022), the Dr. Sydney K. Shapiro Humanitarian Award at the Phoenix Film Festival (2022), the Best Editing of a Documentary Award at the Madrid International Film Festival (2022) and the Excellence in Editing Award at the Docs Without Borders Film Festival (2022). Dear Audrey was nominated for three Canadian Screen Award at the 11th Canadian Screen Awards (2023); Best Feature Length Documentary, Best Editing in a Documentary, and Best Original Music in a Documentary (composer Walker Grimshaw).

Hayes`s other credits as a director include Elefanti (1989), Silence & Storm (1995), God Comes As a Child (1998), and The Prom (1998).

Hayes`s credits as an editor include The Death Tour, Tautuktavuk (What We See) (2023), Tia and Piujuq (2018), Above the Drowning Sea (2017), Sol (2014), The Wolverine: The Fight of the James Bay Cree (2014), Shekinah: The Intimate Life of Hasidic Women (2013), The Last Explorer (2009), Inside the Great Magazines (2007), Vendetta Song (2005), and Unbreakable Minds (2004).

== Honors and awards ==
- Gemini Award for Best Direction in a Documentary Program co-directing for Reel Injun (2010)
- Canadian Screen Award for Best Editing in a Documentary for Rumble (2018)
- Peabody Award for Best Electronic Media for Reel Injun (2011)
- Iris Award for Best Feature Documentary for Dear Audrey the Gala du Quebec Cinema (2023)
- Iris Award for Best Editing of a Feature Documentary for Dear Audrey at the Gala du Quebec Cinema (2023)
- The People's Choice Award for Dear Audrey at the Montreal International Documentary Festival (RIDM) (2021)
- Prix Gémeaux nomination for Best Documentary Program at the 38th prix Gémeaux, Academy of Canadian Cinema (2024)
- Canadian Screen Award nomination for Best Feature Length Documentary at the 11th Canadian Screen Awards, (2023)
- Canadian Screen Award nomination for Best Editing in a Documentary nomination at the 11th Canadian Screen Awards, (2023)

== Filmography ==
Year	Title	Contribution	Description	Awards & Associated Honors
1989	Elefanti	Director, editor, Camera, Producer	15 minute documentary (TVO)	-Best Short Documentary, Melbourne International Film Festival, 1990. -Best 16mm production, Montreal International Young Film Festival, 1990. -Special Commendation, Canadian International Annual Film Festival, 1990. -Best Final Year Production, Concordia University, 1989.
1995	Silence & Storm	Director, editor, Camera	52 minute documentary (NFB, TVO)	-Bronze Apple Award, Santa Barbara Educational Film Festival, 1996.
1998	God Comes As a Child	Director, editor, Camera, Producer	25 minute documentary (CBC, CBC NEWS WORLD, VISION, WTN)	-Bronze Plaque, Columbus Ohio International Film Festival, 1998. -Best Short, Nominee, HotDocs Documentary Film Festival, 1998. -Selected for the Toronto International Film Festival, 1998. -Season Opener for CBC's Man Alive series, 1998. -Special Commendation, Canadian International Annual Film Festival, 1998. -Special Commendation, Houston International Film Festival, 1990.
1998	The Prom	Director, editor, Camera	52 minute documentary (NFB, CTV, TVO, TVQ)	
2001	Shrinkage	Editor	45 min. documentary (CBC, VISION)	
2001	Coming Out	Lead Editor	90 minute documentary (LIFE)	
2002	Cirque for Life	Editor	52 minute documentary (CBC, LIFE)	
2002	She Got Game	Editor	90 minute documentary (CBC, LIFE, TVO, TVQ)	
2004	Unbreakable Minds	Editor, writer	56 minute documentary (VISION)	
2005	Vendetta Song	Editor, writer, Camera	52 minute documentary (NFB, VISION)	
2007	Inside the Great Magazines	Editor, writer	3 x 1 hour documentary series (Global)	
2007	Canadaville U.S.A.	Editor, writer	90 minute documentary (CBC, Tele-Quebec)	
2009	The Last Explorer	Editor, writer	90 minute drama (APTN)	
2009	Reel Injun	Director, editor, writer	90 minute documentary (PBS, CBC, NFB)	-Best Direction in a Documentary Program, Gemini Award, 2010. -The Canada Award for Best Multicultural Program, Gemini Awards, 2010. -Special Founders Prize, Spirit Award, Nonfiction Jury Award, Traverse City Film Festival, 2011. -Best Documentary Feature, Fargo Film Festival, 2011. -Best Use of Footage in a Factual Program, FOCAL International Awards, 2011. -Best International Indigenous Entry, Mana Wairoa Film Awards, 2010. -In 2021, Reel Injun is featured in the Academy Museum of Motion Pictures core exhibition of the Stories of Cinema.
2010	Down the Mighty River	Editor, writer	6 x 1/2 hour documentary series (APTN)	
2010	The Uluit: Champions of the North	Editor	5 x 1/2 hour documentary series (APTN)	
2013	Shekinah: The Intimate Life of Hasidic Women	Editor, writer, Camera	90 minute documentary (Radio Canada)	
2013	Big Wind	Editor, writer, Camera	90 minute documentary (TVO)	
2014	The Wolverine: The Fight of the James Bay Cree	Editor, writer	10 minute documentary (Rezolution Pictures)	
2014	Sol	Editor	90 minute documentary (Super Chanel)	
2017	Above the Drowning Sea	Editor, Post Production Supervisor	90 minute documentary (Time & Rhythm Cinema Inc.)	
2017	Rumble: The Indians Who Rocked the World	Editor, Camera	90 minute documentary (Movie Network, ARTE, APTN, SCR/RDI, ARTV)	-Canadian Screen Awards for Best Editing in a Documentary, 2017.
2018	Tia and Piujuq	Editor	80 minute drama (APTN)	
2020	The Real Neanderthal	Editor	52 minute documentary (CBC, The Nature of Things)	
2021	Dear Audrey	Director, producer, editor, writer, Camera, Location Sound, Archival Research	90 minute documentary (Cineflix Media, The Super Channel, NFB)	People's Choice Award, Montreal International Documentary Festival, (RIDM), 2021.; Iris Award for Best Feature Documentary, Gala du Quebec Cinema, 2023.; Iris Award for Best Editing Feature Documentary, Gala du Quebec Cinema, 2023.; Dr. Sydney K. Shapiro Humanitarian Award, Phoenix Film Festival, 2022.; Best Feature Documentary Award at the Indy Film Fest, 2022.; The Cercle d'or for Best Feature Documentary Award at the Sherbrooke World Film Festival, 2022.; Grand Prix Documentary Award Rising Sun International Film Festival, Japan (2022); Silver Award for Best Feature Documentary at the Tokyo Film Awards, 2022.; Best Editing of a Documentary Award at the Madrid International Film Festival, 2022.; Excellence in Editing Award at the Docs Without Borders Film Festival, 2022.; Best Editing Brussels World Film Festival, Belgium (2022).; Best Feature Length Documentary nomination at the 11th Canadian Screen Awards, 2023.; Best Editing in a Documentary nomination at the 11th Canadian Screen Awards, 2023.; Best Canadian Documentary Nominated at the Vancouver Film Critics Circle, Canada (2023).; Best Documentary Program nomination at the 38th prix Gémeaux, Academy of Canadian Cinema(2024).
2023	Tautuktavuk (What We See)	Editor		
