= Dear Audrey =

Canadian documentary film

- Directed by: Jeremiah Hayes
- Written by: Jeremiah Hayes, Co-Writer Daniel Diaz
- Produced by: André Barro; Annette Clarke; Jeremiah Hayes
- Starring: Martin Duckworth; Audrey Schirmer; Jacqueline Schirmer, Marya Duckworth, Sylvia Duckworth, Danielle Schirmer, Nick Schirmer
- Cinematography: Jeremiah Hayes
- Edited by: Jeremiah Hayes
- Music by: Walker Grimshaw
- Production companies: National Film Board of Canada; Cineflix; SwingDog Films
- Distributed by: National Film Board of Canada, and Cineflix Media
- Release date: November 19, 2021 (RIDM)
- Running time: 89 minutes
- Country: Canada
- Language: English

Dear Audrey is a 2021 documentary film directed by Jeremiah Hayes. The film centres on activist and filmmaker Martin Duckworth, as he cares for his wife Audrey Schirmer through the later stages of Alzheimer’s disease.

== Synopsis ==
One of Canada's most prolific documentary filmmakers, Martin Duckworth is also known as a devoted peace activist. But when his wife Audrey Schirmer was diagnosed with Alzhiemer's in 2013, he stopped making films in order to care for her full time.

Dear Audrey revisits those moments using excerpts from Martin’s films and Audrey’s photography. As Audrey's condition degrades, Martin's involvement and love grow stronger. Their daughter Jacqueline, a person with autism spectrum disorder, also struggles with her mother’s illness, but Martin is devoted to making his wife and daughter's lives meaningful.

== Production and release ==
Dear Audrey is a co-production between Cineflix Media, the National Film Board of Canada, and SwingDog Films.

Filming began in 2016 and continued over the next four years with Hayes shooting once or twice a month at Martin's home. During this time, there was no source of outside funding. After four years of shooting, Hayes edited half of the film in order to make a short promo video to use to raise interest with producers in order to finish the film. In winter 2020, Cineflix Media and the National Film Board of Canada became the film's co-producers.

Dear Audrey combines footage shot in Martin and Audrey's Montreal apartment, Audrey's black and white photography, clips from some of Martin Duckworth's thirty documentaries, period archives, and black and white animation. The music was composed by Walker Grimshaw.

The film debuted on November 19, 2021 at the Montreal International Documentary Festival (RIDM), and toured film festivals throughout Canada and internationally.

== Reception ==
=== Critical response ===
Charlie Smith of The Georgia Straight said, “Martin Duckworth spent decades telling other people's truths. But the former NFB director is actually in front of the camera for some of his most compelling and candid moments in cinema... Anyone who watches Dear Audrey will undoubtedly conclude that Hayes is a masterful filmmaker”.

Dorothy Woodend of The Tyee gave a positive review saying, “The central force of Dear Audrey is the eternal, almost implacable force of love that binds people together through the most difficult times. It is this energy, emanating out in a thousand small ways, that lies at the heart of the film. Mysterious and ordinary, invisible yet undeniable.”

Silvia Galipeau of La Presse also reviewed the film positively : “It's impossible to watch 90 minutes of this documentary, without being overwhelmed by its sweetness and generosity. Through this very beautiful film, about this so beautiful love”.

Janet Smith of Stir Vancouver said, "Hayes’s patience pays off in many small, but profound moments over the course of the film... Hayes has crafted a film that shifts the thinking around Alzheimer’s: that it is not a sentence of darkness and hopelessness. That there can be tenderness and dignity within the journey".

=== Awards ===
- 2021 Montreal International Documentary Festival (RIDM), People's Choice Award
- 2022 Indy Film Fest, Best Feature Documentary Award
- 2022 Sherbrooke World Film Festival, Cercle d’or for Best Feature Documentary Award
- 2022 Tokyo Film Awards, Silver Award for Best Feature Documentary
- 2022 Phoenix Film Festival, Dr. Sydney K. Shapiro Humanitarian Award
- 2022 Madrid International Film Festival, Best Editing of a Documentary Award
- 2022 Docs Without Borders Film Festival, Excellence in Editing Award
- 2022 Rising Sun International Film Festival, Grand Prix for Best Documentary Award
- 2023 Vancouver Film Critics Circle Awards, Canada Best Canadian Documentary Nomination
- 2023 Canadian Screen Award nominations at the 11th Canadian Screen Awards for Best Feature Length Documentary, Best Editing in a Documentary (Hayes) and Best Original Music in a Documentary (Walker Grimshaw).
- 2023 25th Quebec Cinema Awards, Prix Iris for Best Documentary Film.
- 2023 25th Quebec Cinema Awards, Prix Iris for Best Editing in a Documentary.
- 2023 Prix Iris Award Nominations at the 25th Quebec Cinema Awards for Best Music for a Documentary (Composer Walker Grimshaw), and Best Sound for a Documentary, (Mélanie Gauthier, Jeremiah Hayes, Isabelle Lussier).
- 2024 Prix Gémeaux nomination at the 38th prix Gémeaux, Academy of Canadian Cinema for Best Documentary Program.
