= James Kennedy (social psychologist) =

American social psychologist

James Kennedy (born November 5, 1950) is an American social psychologist, best known as an originator and researcher of particle swarm optimization.

== Life and career ==
The first papers on the topic, by Kennedy and Russell C. Eberhart, were presented in 1995; since then tens of thousands of papers have been published on particle swarms. The Academic Press / Morgan Kaufmann book, Swarm Intelligence, by Kennedy and Eberhart with Yuhui Shi, was published in 2001.

The particle swarm paradigm draws on social-psychological simulation research in which Kennedy had participated at the University of North Carolina, integrated with evolutionary computation methods that Eberhart had been working with in the 1990s. The result was a problem-solving or optimization algorithm based on the principles of human social interaction. Individuals begin the program with random guesses at the problem solution. As the program runs, the "particles" share their successes with their topological neighbors; each particle is both teacher and learner. Over time, the population converges reliably on optimal vectors.

While there has been a trend in the research literature toward a "Gbest" or centralized particle network, Blackwell and Kennedy (2018) demonstrated the importance of a distributed population topology in solving more complex problems.

Kennedy was involved in a controversy over sex education in Montgomery County, Maryland, supporting the public schools' efforts to develop a comprehensive and inclusive program. He also worked to support a gender identity nondiscrimination law in Montgomery County that came under attack from conservatives.

He also worked as a professional musician for sixty years and plays "the roots of rock and roll" in a band called The Colliders, which released albums in 2011 and 2015. In 2018 Kennedy released a DIY album, The Life of Mischief.

Kennedy worked in survey methods for the US government until his retirement in 2017, and has conducted basic and applied research into social effects on cognition and attitude. He has worked with particle swarms since 1994, with research publications in fields related and unrelated to swarms and surveys.

== See also ==
- Particle Swarm Optimization
