= Life TV Media =

British broadcasting company

Life

Ownership
- Owner: Life TV Media

History
- Launched: October 2000
- Closed: 15 September 2009; 16 years ago

Links
- Website: www.lifetv.org.uk

Life TV Media was an independent UK broadcaster who produced television content for its own channels and other broadcasters.

== History ==
Life TV Media started their programming on the Sky Digital platform in October 2000 with Liberty TV. The channel was rebranded as Life TV on 5 October 2001. A timeshift channel, Life TV +2, was launched on 18 April 2005.

In 2006 Life TV was fined £100,000 for breaches of the Ofcom Broadcasting Code between 8 August 2005 & 28 February 2006. Some of the breaches related to Life Showcase TV.

By 2007 the company had three of its own channels, Life TV, Life 24 and Life Showcase TV which on 20 August 2007 they compacted into just one station, Life One, due to their EPG re-shuffle Life TV Media sold the Sky Digital EPG numbers of its three previous stations to the Channel Four Television Corporation so that Channel 4 could group all of their channels together in one block.

When operating as Life One the programming was split into seven 'zones' and each zone was focused on different types of programmes. The seven zones were Lifestyle, Factual, Sports, Music, Reality, Drama and Films.

Before it suddenly went off air and off the Sky listings on 11 March 2008, Life One broadcast for 24 hours a day on Sky Channel 197. No explanation was given for its unexpected disappearance. However, after a few weeks of testing outside of the EPG Life One returned to its old slot on Sky's EPG at channel number 197.

However, Life One closed down again on 16 June 2008. Life One then relaunched as Life on 11 August 2008 on Sky EPG 197 and it timeshared with Over 18 TV. Life moved to channel number 186 on 1 September 2008. Life was finally removed from the Sky EPG on 15 September 2009.
