= Magnus Isacsson =

Canadian documentary filmmaker (1948–2012)

Magnus Isacsson (1948 – August 2, 2012) was a Canadian documentary filmmaker whose films investigated contemporary political issues and topics in social activism.

== Early life and television career ==
Isacsson was born in Sweden in 1948. His father founded and ran an art school and his mother taught children with learning disabilities. Isacsson first became involved with photography, with photographs exhibited at the Museum of Modern Art in Stockholm when he was 18 years old. He immigrated to Canada in 1970. He first worked as a radio producer for Sveriges Radio and the CBC, before moving into television to direct reports for the English– and French-language CBC television networks, for such programs as The Fifth Estate and Le Point.

== Film career ==
Frustrated by the creative constraints of working for TV networks, Isacsson began a career as an independent filmmaker in 1986. His film Uranium, the story of radioactive contamination on Native land by Canada's uranium mines, won a Golden Sheaf Award at the Yorkton Film Festival in 1991; Power, a feature-length chronicle of the Cree's five-year struggle against the Great Whale Hydro Project in Northern Quebec, received the award for Best Documentary at the International Environmental Film Festival in Paris (1997), among other accolades and nominations. The Choir Boys (Enfants de chœur !), a film about the journey of a choir of homeless men in Montreal, won the award for Best Documentary at the Mumbai International Film Festival in 2000.

Isacsson has been involved in the Documentary Organization of Canada (formerly CIFC) since its beginning, contributing to the formation of the Montreal chapter in 1988. He was also involved in starting the Rencontres internationales du documentaire de Montréal (RIDM) as a member of its first programming committee. In association with the RIDM, Isacsson instigated the Docu-Mondays (Lundis du Doc) screening series. Isacsson was a member of the ARRQ director's union in Quebec, and has served as a board member for the Observatoire du Documentaire.

Isacsson's last film was the feature-length documentary My Real Life (Ma vie réelle), released in 2012. At the time of his death, Isacsson was working on Granny Power, a film about the Raging Grannies.

== Teaching ==
In addition to his filmmaking, Isacsson was also a university educator and a pioneer in community media, teaching audiovisual production courses in Zimbabwe and South Africa while working with Vidéo Tiers Monde.

== Death and posthumous honours ==
Magnus Isacsson died of cancer in Montreal, Quebec on August 2, 2012. As of August 2012, the RIDM presents an annual award in Isacsson's memory.

== Filmography ==
- Toivo - 1990
- Union Trouble - 1991
- Uranium - 1991
- Out of the Ashes - 1991
- The Emperor's New Clothes - 1995
- Power - 1996
- The Big Upheaval - 1996
- Vivre Ensemble - 1997
- Pressure Point - 1999
- The Choir Boys (Enfants de chœur !) - 1999
- Maxime, McDuff & McDo - 2002
- View from the Summit - 2002
- Waiting for Martin - 2004
- Hell-bent for Justice - 2005
- The Battle of Rabaska - 2008
- L'Art en Action - 2009
- My Real Life (Ma vie réelle) - 2012
