= Russell C. Eberhart =

American electrical engineer

Russell C. Eberhart, an American electrical engineer, best known as the co-developer of particle swarm optimization concept (with James Kennedy (social psychologist)). He is professor of Electrical and Computer Engineering and adjunct professor of Biomedical Engineering at the Purdue School of Engineering and Technology, Indiana University Purdue University Indianapolis (IUPUI). He is a Fellow of the IEEE and a Fellow of the American Institute for Medical and Biological Engineering.

He earned a Ph.D. in electrical engineering from Kansas State University in 1972. He was Associate Editor of IEEE Transactions on Evolutionary Computation and past President of IEEE Neural Networks Council.

== Publications ==
- Neural Network PC Tools, published by Academic Press in 1990. Co-editor.
- Computational Intelligence PC Tools, published by Academic Press Professional, 1996. Co-author.
- Swarm Intelligence, published by Morgan Kaufmann in 2001. Co-author.
- Computational Intelligence: Concepts to Implementations, published by Morgan Kaufmann in 2007. Co-author.
