= Jeremiah F. Hayes =

American electrical engineer

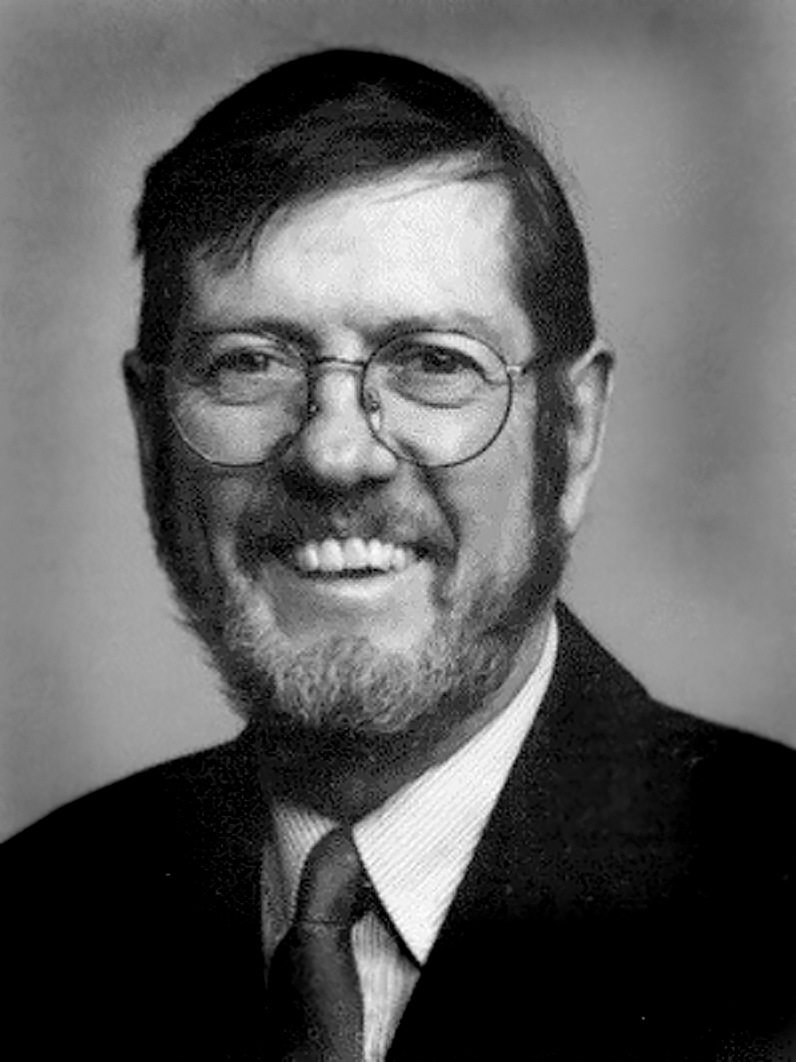
Jeremiah F. Hayes

Jeremiah F. Hayes was an award-winning North American professor of electrical engineering. In 1983, he was honored as an IEEE fellow for his first published book which was about computer communications. On that project, Hayes worked with Andrew Viterbi on combining Erlang (unit) with Shannon–Hartley theorem. He also co-authored a communications textbook entitled Digital Communications Principles with Stephen Weinstein and Richard D. Gitlin. He received the Canadian Award for Telecommunications Research in 1996, and was a senior editor of the Journal on Selected Areas in Communications (JSAC). His most noted work was subgroup polling. Jeremiah Francis Hayes was born on July 8, 1934, in New York NY, and died on May 8, 2018, in Victoria BC, Canada.

== Early life and education ==
On July 8, 1934, Jeremiah F. Hayes was born to Irish immigrants in Manhattan, and grew up there with his mother Mary, father James and siblings Catherine, Marjorie and John. After graduating from Cardinal Hayes High School, he went on to receive his B.E.E Degree from Manhattan College 1956 with honors. He later received a M.Sc. Mathematics degree from New York University. From 1956 to 1959, Hayes received professional training under Bell Telephone Laboratories Communications Development Training Program. He graduated with a PhD from University of California, Berkeley with distinction in 1966; his Ph.D supervisor was George L. Turin.

== Honors & Awards ==
-IEEE Communications Society Magazine Prize Paper, 1982 for paper entitled “Local Distribution in Computer Communications”, Vol.. 19, No.2, March 1981.

-IEEE Information Theory Group Special Acknowledgment in 1982 for paper entitled “An Adaptive Technique for Local Distribution”, IEEE Transactions on Communications, Vol. Com-26, 1978.

-Fellow - (IEEE), January 1983 for contributions to local distribution.

-NSERC Senior Industrial Fellow 1989–1990.

-Fourth Recipient-Canadian Award in Telecommunications Research, June 3, 1996, for contributions to computer communications and communication networks.

-Erskine Fellow, University of Canterbury, 1997.

-Hayes's paper on The Viterbi Algorithm Applied to Digital Data Transmission was honored by the IEEE Communication Society for being among the top ten best papers appearing in the Communication Society, Vol. 13, No. 2, March 1975, pp. 15–20.

== Career ==
Hayes was an instructor in the Department of Electrical Engineering at UCB from 1962 to 1964, and returned as assistant professor in 1966. He joined the Department of Electronic Engineering at Purdue University, West Lafayette Indiana, as an assistant professor from 1966 to 1978. During that time, he made important contributions to data and computer communications at Bell Telephone Laboratories, Holmdel, New Jersey. From 1974 to 1978, he served as a part-time lecturer in the Department of Electrical Engineering at Polytechnic Institute of New York. Hayes also worked as a professor at McGill University, in the Department of Electrical Engineering, where he served a professor from 1978 to 1984, and as adjunct professor from 1984 to present. Hayes also works as a professor at the University of Canterbury in Christchurch, New Zealand, where he was recognized as an Erskine Fellow in 1996. "He was especially known for innovative polling techniques for local distribution of data traffic, in particular the concept of subgroup polling to significantly reduce the polling traffic overhead (and consequent delays) in comparison with one-by-one polling of data terminals. This was described in his seminal paper, An Adaptive Technique for Local Distribution, published in IEEE Transactions on Communications in September, 1978." He served as a department chair at Concordia University, Montreal, Canada, from 1984 to 1989, retired as distinguished professor Emeritus, and later as a professor from 1984 to present, where he co-supervised Jun (Steed) Huang with Canada Research Chair Prof. Tho Le-Ngoc on the project of broadband satellite. Steed is teaching at Ottawa using the paper book listed below that Jerry Hayes co-authored with Ganesh Babu as of 2020 winter. Hayes later joined the University of Victoria as an adjunct professor from 2005.

=== Family ===
Hayes had four children with his first wife Florence Perrella, Mary, Annie, Jeremiah (filmmaker) and Martin.
