= Cooperation (disambiguation) =

Cooperation:

- Cooperation - as used in the social sciences.
- Co-operation (evolution) - co-operative behaviors in biology
- Cooperative - economic model
- Microbial cooperation – cooperation between microorganisms

== See also ==
- Concerted action (disambiguation)
