= Microbial food web =

Biological food web

The microbial food web describes the network of trophic interactions among microorganisms in aquatic ecosystems, including viruses, bacteria, algae, and heterotrophic protists (such as ciliates and flagellates). From a broad stance, microorganisms form the base of many aquatic food webs. Photosynthetic microbes such as cyanobacteria, diatoms, and other phytoplankton convert sunlight into organic matter through photosynthesis. Heterotrophic bacteria consume dissolved organic matter, while protists graze on bacteria and small algae. These interactions regulate the transfer of energy and nutrients through processes such as primary production, grazing, decomposition, the microbial loop, and viral lysis. Microbial food webs play a central role in global carbon, nitrogen, and phosphorus cycling and strongly influence ecosystem productivity via nutrient cycling in both freshwater and marine ecosystems.

== Major Components ==
In aquatic environments, microbes constitute the base of the food web. Single celled photosynthetic organisms such as diatoms and cyanobacteria are generally the most important primary producers in the open ocean. Many of these cells, especially cyanobacteria, are too small to be captured and consumed by small crustaceans and planktonic larva. Instead, these cells are consumed by phagotrophic protists which are readily consumed by larger organisms.

Viruses

Viruses are abundant in aquatic ecosystems and infect bacteria, archaea, and phytoplankton. Viral infection often causes cell lysis, releasing dissolved organic matter and nutrients into the environment. This process can regulate microbial population size and alter nutrient availability. Specifically, viruses release organic matter back into the environment by infecting and lysing planktonic algae (a.k.a. phytoplankton) and bacterial cells (bacteriophages). This mechanism, called the viral shunt, promotes nutrient recycling and aids in the control of microbial populations. Viral particles and dissolved organic carbon (DOC), which can be further used by other microorganisms, are released when bacterial cells are lysed. Viruses can infect and break open bacterial cells and (to a lesser extent), planktonic algae. Therefore, viruses in the microbial food web act to reduce the population of bacteria and, by lysing bacterial cells, release particulate and dissolved organic carbon (DOC).

Bacteria

Bacteria and archaea play a crucial role in decomposing organic matter and recycling nutrients. They convert DOC into bacterial biomass that can then be consumed by protists. Additionally, many bacterial and archaea groups also participate in the nitrogen transformations such as nitrification and denitrification, among other biogeochemical cycles.

Phytoplankton and Algae

In aquatic ecosystems, single-celled photosynthetic organisms like cyanobacteria and diatoms are primary producers. Organic carbon is generated through photosynthesis: the transformation of sunlight into chemical energy and creation of organic matter, which is the foundation of the microbial food chain. Particularly significant in nutrient-poor environments are cyanobacteria because of their capacity to fix atmospheric nitrogen. When vital nutrients like nitrogen and phosphorus are scarce during periods of uneven development, algal cells have the potential to produce DOC. DOC may also be released into the environment by algal cells. One of the reasons phytoplankton release DOC termed "unbalanced growth" is when essential nutrients (e.g. nitrogen and phosphorus) are limiting. Therefore, carbon produced during photosynthesis is not used for the synthesis of proteins (and subsequent cell growth), but is limited due to a lack of the nutrients necessary for macromolecules. Excess photosynthate, or DOC is then released, or exuded.

Heterotrophic Protists

Protists such as ciliates and flagellates consume bacteria, algae, and other small particles. They are an important link between microbial producers and consumers as they move nutrients and energy up the food chain. Larger creatures like zooplankton feed on these protists in turn.

== Core Microbial Processes ==
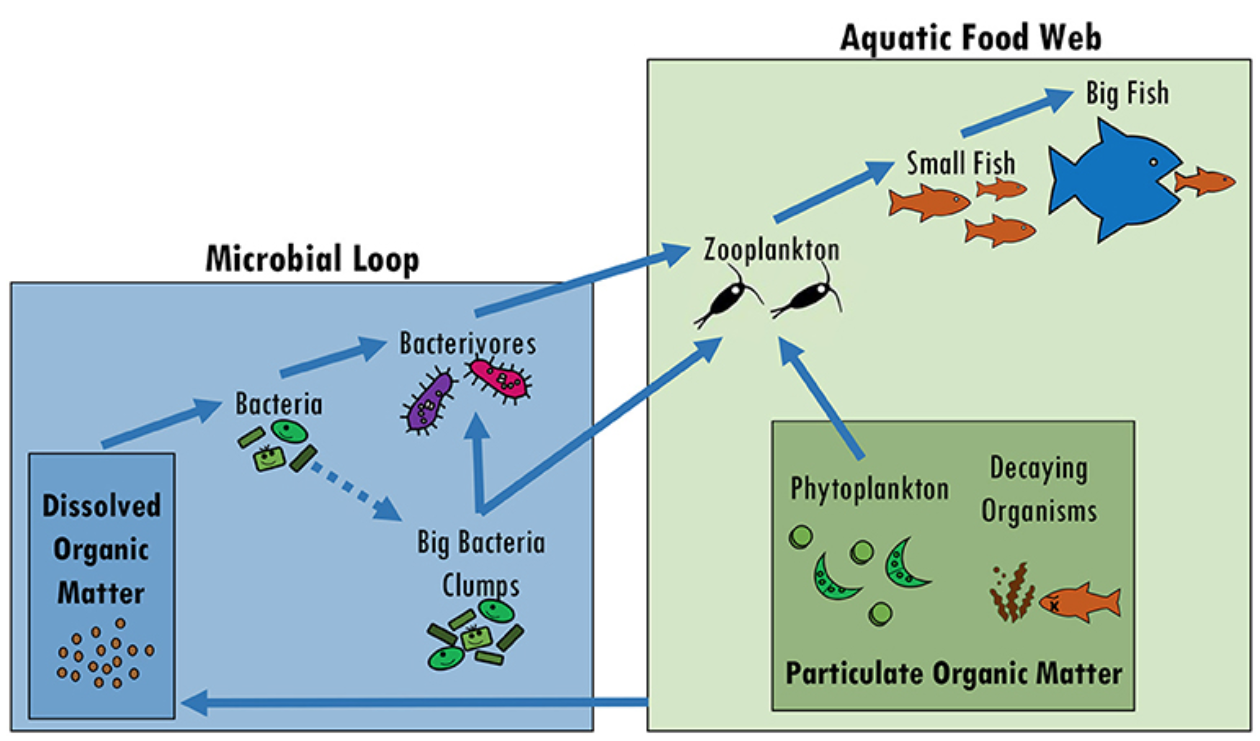
Microbial Loop in Aquatic Ecosystems

Microbial Loop

The microbial loop describes a pathway in the microbial food web where DOC is returned to higher trophic levels via the incorporation into bacterial biomass. This loop makes sure that the DOC created by photosynthetic organisms is used by heterotrophic bacteria and then moves up the food chain, which is crucial for sustaining the flow of nutrients and energy within the ecosystem. The food web's microbial interactions are varied and diverse. Predation, rivalry, and symbiotic connections are some of these interactions. For instance, certain bacteria and algae create mutualistic relationships in which the bacteria give the algae vital nutrients, and the algae give the bacteria organic carbon. Microbial communities can be shaped by competition for resources like light and nutrition, which can affect their makeup and functionality.

Viral Shunt

The viral shunt refers to the release of dissolved organic matter following viral lysis of microbial cells. Rather than transferring biomass directly to grazers, cellular material is redirected into dissolved pools that can be reused by bacteria and other microbes. This pathway influences marine carbon flow and nutrient recycling.

Grazing and Predation

Notable to the microbial food web is grazing and predation. Protistan grazing controls bacterial and phytoplankton abundance and transfers biomass to larger consumers. Grazing pressure can strongly influence community composition and productivity.

== Role in Biogeochemical Cycles ==
Microbial food webs are major drivers of global biogeochemical cycles. Photosynthetic microbes fix carbon dioxide into organic matter, while respiration and decomposition return carbon to water pools and the atmosphere. Microorganisms also regulate nitrogen availability through nitrogen fixation, nitrification, and denitrification. Additionally, uptake and regeneration by microbes influence phosphorus cycling in both marine and freshwater systems.

== Environmental Controls ==
Environmental factors that have a significant impact on microbial food webs include temperature, salinity, availability of light, and nutrient concentrations. Changes in these conditions may shift species composition, metabolic rates, and energy flow pathways.

Microbe development and metabolic rates are influenced by temperature, and photosynthetic organisms are impacted by light availability. The availability of nutrients, especially phosphorus and nitrogen, might restrict the growth and productivity of microorganisms. For instance, during times of nitrogen constraint, phytoplankton may emit DOC, a phenomenon referred to as imbalanced growth.

== Human Impact ==
Human activities such as nutrient pollution, climate change, ocean acidification, and contamination can alter microbial food webs. A major impact of human activity on microbial food webs is eutrophication, pollution, and climate change. The entire aquatic food chain may be impacted by eutrophication, which is brought on by nutrient runoff from cities and farms. Eutrophication can also result in toxic algal blooms and hypoxic conditions. The activities of microbial communities can be disturbed by pollutants like pesticides and heavy metals. Microbial growth and dispersal are impacted by temperature and precipitation changes brought about by climate change.

== Research Methods and Technological Advances ==
Technological developments have completely changed the way that microbial food webs are studied. Modern study of microbial food webs uses microscopy, flow cytometry, metagenomics, stable isotope tracers, and remote sensing. By analyzing genetic material from environmental samples, researchers can get insights into the diversity and roles of microbial communities using metagenomics. The utilization of remote sensing technology facilitates the large-scale monitoring of environmental variables and microbial activity, consequently augmenting our comprehension of microbial dynamics across various ecosystems. These tools allow researchers to examine microbial diversity, abundance, nutrient fluxes, and ecosystem-scale patterns.

== See also ==
- Microbial cooperation
- Microbial intelligence
- Microbial population biology

== Other references ==
- Michaels, A.F. and Silver, M.W. (1988) "Primary production, sinking fluxes and the microbial food web". Deep Sea Research Part A. Oceanographic Research Papers, 35(4): 473–90. doi:10.1016/0198-0149(88)90126-4
