= Microbial consortium =

Groups of bacteria living symbiotically

A microbial consortium or microbial community, is two or more bacterial or microbial groups living symbiotically. Consortiums can be endosymbiotic or ectosymbiotic, or occasionally may be both. The protist Mixotricha paradoxa, itself an endosymbiont of the Mastotermes darwiniensis termite, is always found as a consortium of at least one endosymbiotic coccus, multiple ectosymbiotic species of flagellate or ciliate bacteria, and at least one species of helical Treponema bacteria that forms the basis of Mixotricha protists' locomotion.

The concept of a consortium was first introduced by Johannes Reinke in 1872, and in 1877 the term symbiosis was introduced and later expanded on. Evidence for symbiosis between microbes strongly suggests it to have been a necessary precursor of the evolution of land plants and for their transition from algal communities in the sea to land.

== Overview ==
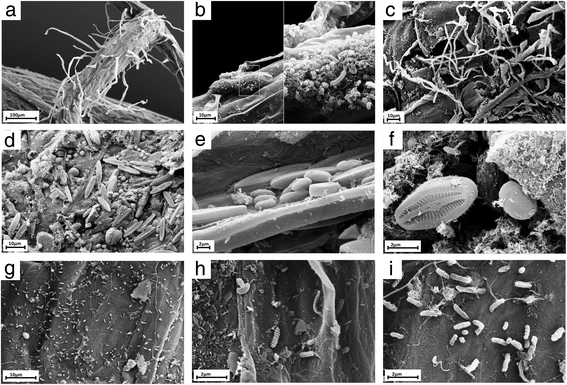
Microbial consortia naturally formed on the roots of Arabidopsis thaliana Scanning electron microscopy pictures of root surfaces from natural A. thaliana populations showing the complex microbial networks formed on roots. a) Overview of an A. thaliana root (primary root) with numerous root hairs. b) Biofilm-forming bacteria. c) Fungal or oomycete hyphae surrounding the root surface. d) Primary root densely covered by spores and protists. e, f) Protists, most likely belonging to the Bacillariophyceae class. g) Bacteria and bacterial filaments. h, i) Different bacterial individuals showing great varieties of shapes and morphological features.

Microbes hold promising application potential to raise the efficiency of bioprocesses when dealing with substances that are resistant to decomposition. A large number of microorganisms have been isolated based on their ability to degrade recalcitrant materials such as lignocellulose and polyurethanes. In many cases of degradation efficiency, microbial consortia have been found superior when compared to single strains. For example, novel thermophilic consortia of Brevibacillus spp. and Aneurinibacillus sp. have been isolated from the environment to enhance polymer degradation.

Two approaches exist to obtain microbial consortia involving either (i) a synthetic assembly from scratch by combining several isolated strains, or (ii) obtainment of complex microbial communities from environmental samples. For the later, enrichment process is often used to get the desired microbial consortia. For instance, a termite gut-derived consortium showing a high xylanase activity was enriched on raw wheat straw as the sole carbon source, which was able to transform lignocellulose into carboxylates under anaerobic conditions.

Relatively high diversity levels are still observed despite the use of enrichment steps when working from environmental samples, likely due to the high functional redundancy observed in environmental microbial communities, being a key asset of their functional stability. This intrinsic diversity may stand as a bottleneck in attempts to move forward to practical application due to (i) potential negative correlation with efficiency, (ii) real microbial cheaters whose presence has no impacts on degradation, (iii) security threats posed by the presence of known or unknown pathogens, and (iv) risks of losing the properties of interest if supported by rare taxa.

Utilization of microbial consortia with less complexity, but equal efficiency, can lead to more controlled and optimized industrial processes. For instance, a large proportion of functional genes were remarkably altered and the efficiency of diesel biodegradation was increased by reducing the biodiversity of a microbial community from diesel-contaminated soils. Therefore, it is crucial to find reliable strategies to narrow down the diversity toward optimized microbial consortia gained from environmental samples. A reductive-screening approach was applied to construct effective minimal microbial consortia for lignocellulose degradation based on different metabolic functional groups. Additionally, artificial selection approaches (dilution, toxicity, and heat) have been also employed to obtain bacterial consortia. Among them, dilution-to-extinction has already proven its efficiency for obtaining functional microbial consortia from seawater and rumen liquor . Dilution-to-extinction is expected to provide more advantages compared to conventional isolation and assembly as it (i) generates many microbial combinations ready to be screened, (ii) includes strains from the initial microbial pool that might be lost due to cultivation/isolation biases, and (iii) ensures that all microbes are physically present and interacting spontaneously.

== Examples ==
=== Microbialites ===
Microbialites are lithified microbial mats that grow in benthic freshwater and marine environments. Microbialites are the earliest known fossilised evidence of life, dating back 3.7 billion years. Today, modern microbialites are scarce, and are formed mainly by Pseudomonadota (formerly Proteobacteria), cyanobacteria, sulphate-reducing bacteria, diatoms, and microalgae. These microorganisms produce adhesive compounds that cement sand and join other rocky materials to form mineral "microbial mats". The mats build layer by layer, growing gradually over time.

=== Rhizosphere ===
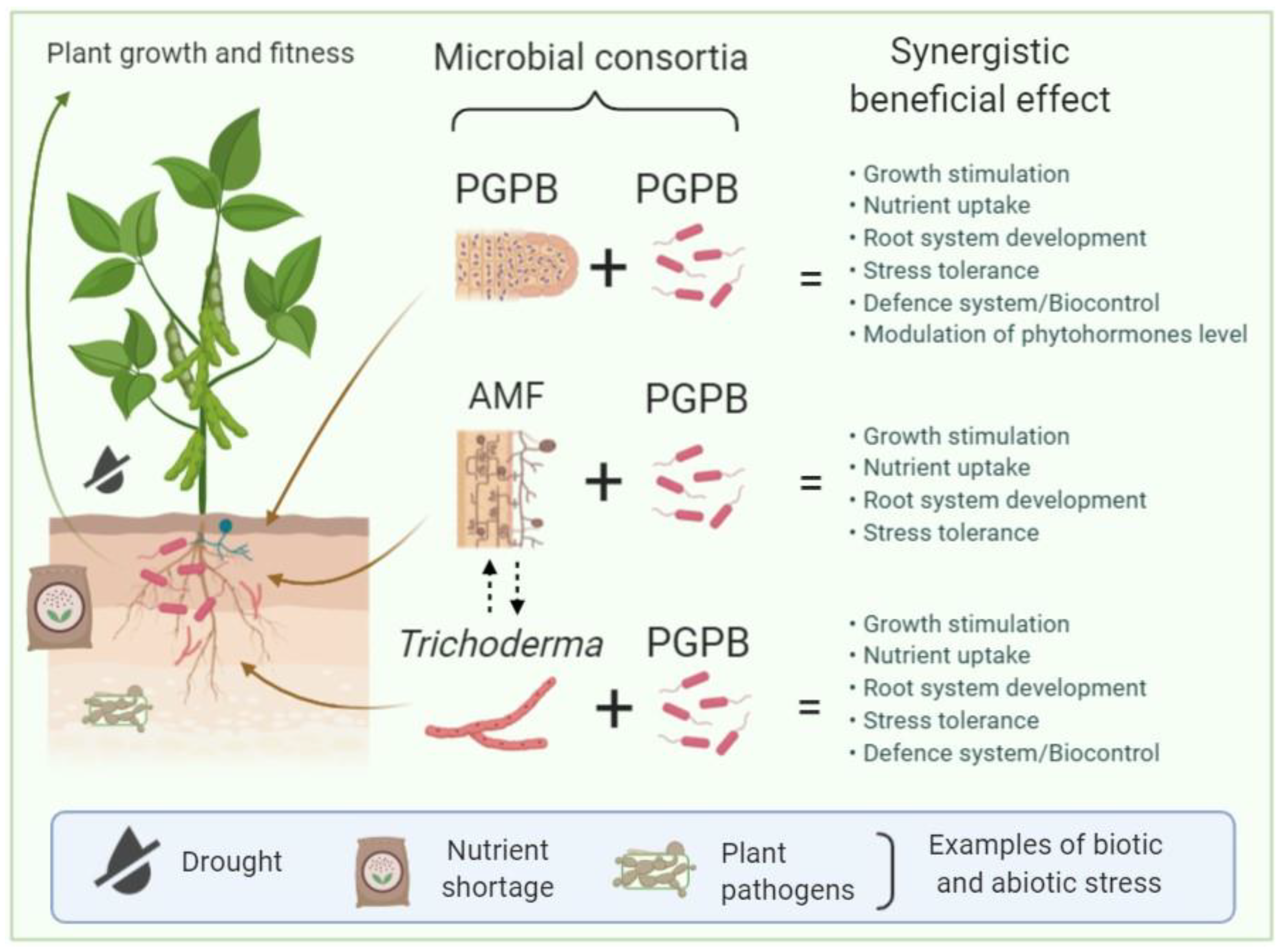
Rhizosphere microbial consortia

Although various studies have shown that single microorganisms can exert beneficial effects on plants, it is increasingly evident that when a microbial consortium — two or more interacting microorganisms — is involved, additive or synergistic results can be expected. This occurs, in part, due to the fact that multiple species can perform a variety of tasks in an ecosystem like the plant root rhizosphere. Beneficial mechanisms of plant growth stimulation include enhanced nutrient availability, phytohormone modulation, biocontrol, biotic and abiotic stress tolerance) exerted by different microbial players within the rhizosphere, such as plant-growth-promoting bacteria (PGPB) and fungi such as Trichoderma and Mycorrhizae.

The diagram on the right illustrates that rhizosphere microorganisms like plant-growth-promoting bacteria (PGPB), arbuscular mycorrhizal fungi (AMF), and fungi from the genus Trichoderma spp. can establish beneficial interactions with plants, promoting plant growth and development, increasing the plant defense system against pathogens, promoting nutrient uptake, and enhancing tolerance to different environmental stresses. Rhizosphere microorganisms can influence one another, and the resulting consortia of PGPB + PGPB (e.g., a nitrogen-fixing bacterium such as Rhizobium spp. and Pseudomonas fluorescens), AMF + PGPB, and Trichoderma + PGPB may have synergetic effects on plant growth and fitness, providing the plant with enhanced benefits to overcome biotic and abiotic stress. Dashed arrows indicate beneficial interactions between AMF and Trichoderma.

=== Keratin degradation ===
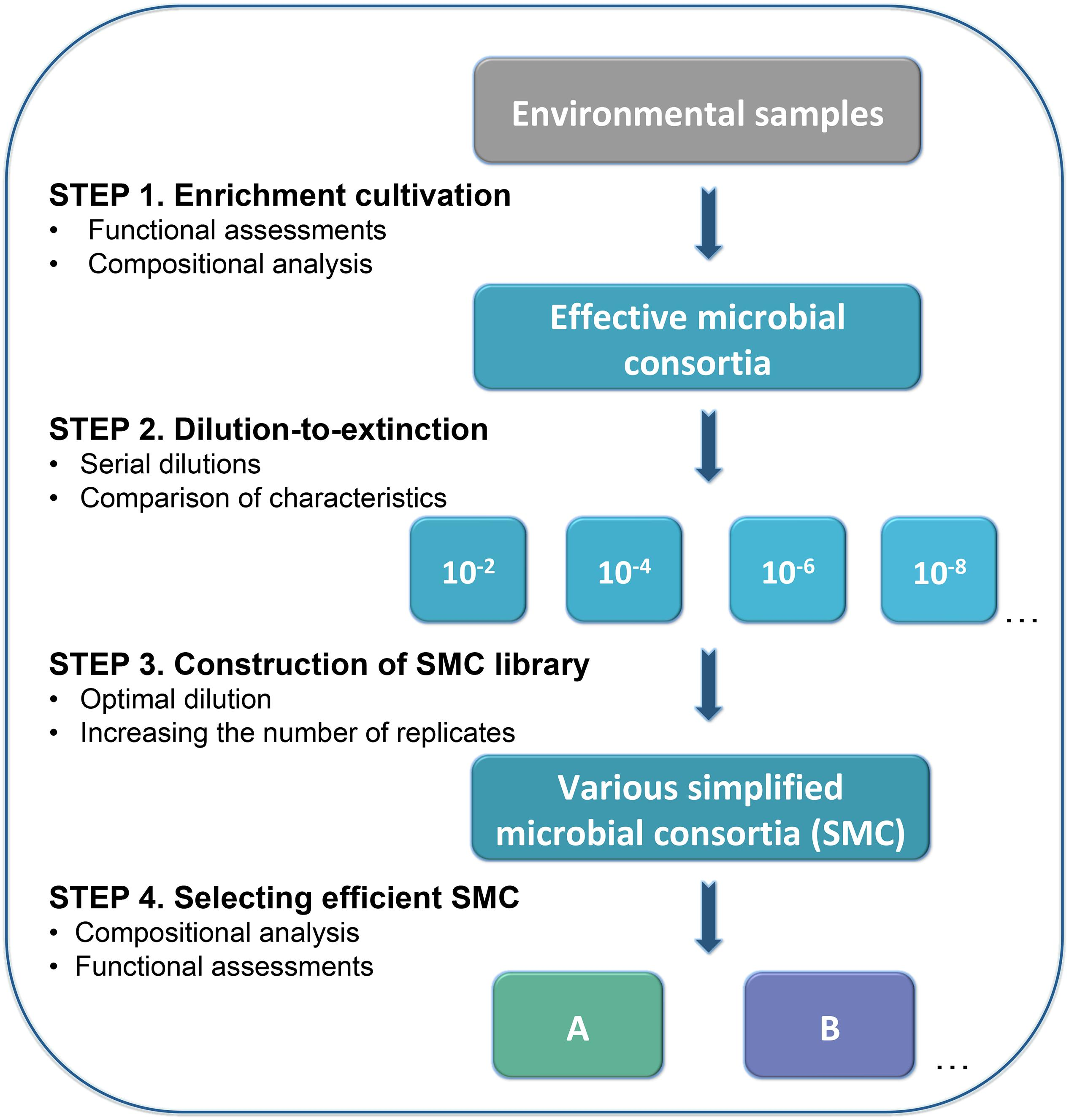
Workflow of enrichment and dilution-to-extinction cultures to select simplified microbial consortia (SMC) for keratin degradation.

The capacity of microbes to degrade recalcitrant materials has been extensively explored for environmental remediation and industrial production. Significant achievements have been made with single strains, but focus is now going toward the use of microbial consortia owing to their functional stability and efficiency. However, assembly of simplified microbial consortia (SMC) from complex environmental communities is still far from trivial due to large diversity and the effect of biotic interactions.

Keratins are recalcitrant fibrous materials with cross-linked components, representing the most abundant proteins in epithelial cells. They are estimated to have considerable economic value after biodegradation. An efficient keratinolytic microbial consortium (KMCG6) was previously enriched from an environmental sample through cultivation in keratin medium. Despite reducing the microbial diversity during the enrichment process, KMCG6 still included several OTUs scattered amongst seven bacterial genera.

In 2020 Kang et al., using a strategy based on enrichment and dilution-to-extinction cultures, extracted from this original consortium (KMCG6) a simplified microbial consortia (SMC) with fewer species but similar keratinolytic activity. Serial dilutions were performed on a keratinolytic microbial consortium pre-enriched from a soil sample. An appropriate dilution regime (10^{9}) was selected to construct a SMC library from the enriched microbial consortium. Further sequencing analysis and keratinolytic activity assays demonstrated that obtained SMC displayed actual reduced microbial diversity, together with various taxonomic composition, and biodegradation capabilities. More importantly, several SMC possessed equivalent levels of keratinolytic efficiency compared to the initial consortium, showing that simplification can be achieved without loss of function and efficiency.

As shown in the diagram on the right, the workflow for this study included four steps: (1) Enrichment for the desired traits e.g., keratinolytic activity by selection in keratin medium, where keratin is the sole carbon source. This process was evaluated by functional assessments (cell density, enzymes activity, and ratio of the residual substrate) and compositional analysis. (2) Serial dilutions were conducted to the enriched effective microbial consortia. Six dilutions were prepared, from dilution 10^{2} to 10^{10} with 24 replicates. The dissimilarity between dilutions was evaluated by Euclidean distance calculation based on functional assessment criteria. (3) Library construction was done from the dilution offering the optimal dissimilarity among replicates. Dilution 10^{9} was selected to construct the SMC library in this case. (4) Selection of the most promising SMC is based on functional and compositional characterization.

=== Human health ===
Consortia are commonly found in humans, with the predominant examples being the skin consortium and the intestinal consortium which provide protection and aid in human nutrition. Additionally, bacteria have been identified as existing within the brain (previously believed to be sterile), with metagenomic evidence suggesting the species found may be enteric in origin. As the species found appear to be well-established, have no discernible impact on human health, and are species known to form consortia when found in the gut, it is highly likely they have also formed a symbiotic consortium within the brain.

== Synthetic microbial consortia ==
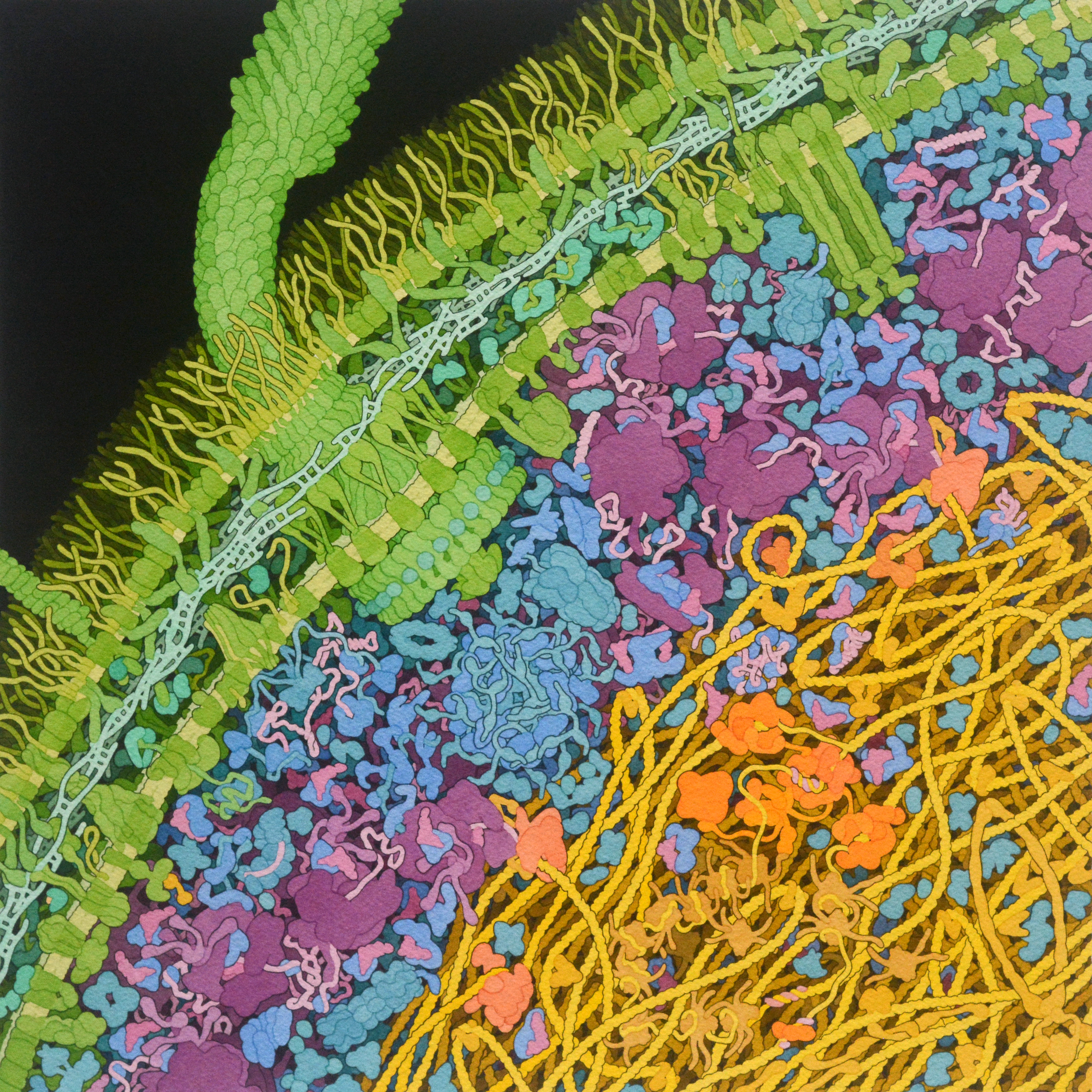
Painting of a cross-section through an Escherichia coli bacterium, a chemoheterotrophic bacterium often used in synthetic microbial consortia.

Synthetic microbial consortia (commonly called co-cultures) are multi-population systems that can contain a diverse range of microbial species, and are adjustable to serve a variety of industrial and ecological interests. For synthetic biology, consortia take the ability to engineer novel cell behaviors to a population level. Consortia are more common than not in nature, and generally prove to be more robust than monocultures. Just over 7,000 species of bacteria have been cultured and identified to date. Many of the estimated 1.2 million bacteria species that remain have yet to be cultured and identified, in part due to inabilities to be cultured axenically. When designing synthetic consortia, or editing naturally occurring consortia, synthetic biologists keep track of pH, temperature, initial metabolic profiles, incubation times, growth rate, and other pertinent variables.

== See also ==
- Biofilm
- Microbial intelligence
- Microbial loop
- Microbial mat
- Microbial population biology
- Synthetic microbial consortia
- Microbial cooperation
