= Artificial life =

Field of study

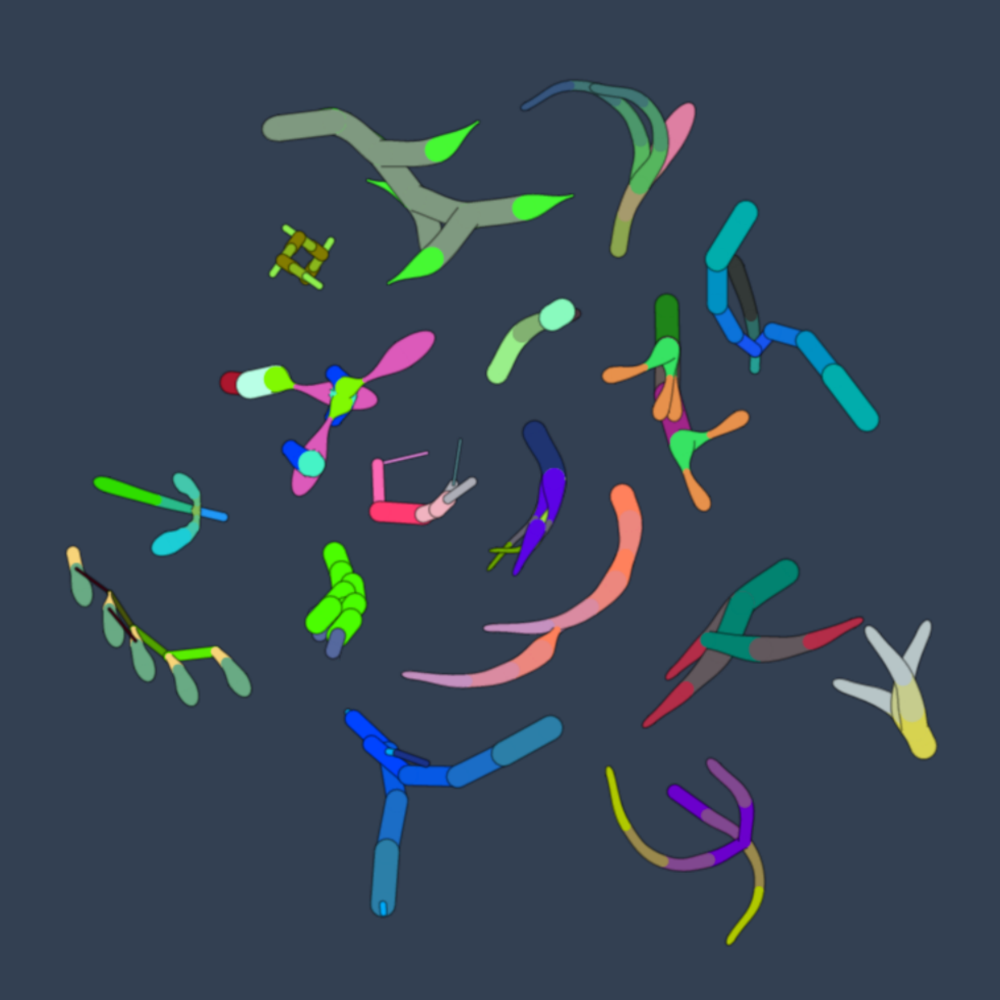
A selection of simulated "swimbots"

Artificial life, also referred to as ALife, is a field of study wherein researchers examine systems related to natural life, its processes, and its evolution, through the use of simulations with computer models, robotics, and biochemistry. The discipline was named by Christopher Langton, an American computer scientist, in 1986. In 1987, Langton organized the first conference on the field, in Los Alamos, New Mexico. There are three main kinds of artificial life, named for their approaches: soft, from software; hard, from hardware; and wet, from biochemistry. Artificial life researchers study traditional biology by trying to replicate aspects of biological phenomena.

== Definitions ==
The organizing committee for the Third International IEEE Symposium on Artificial Life used the definition: "Artificial Life is the study of the simulation and synthesis of living systems."

Artificial life studies the fundamental processes of living systems in artificial environments in order to gain a deeper understanding of the complex information processing that defines such systems. These topics are broad, but often include evolutionary dynamics, emergent properties of collective systems, biomimicry, as well as related issues about the philosophy of the nature of life and the use of lifelike properties in artistic works.

== Philosophy ==
The modeling philosophy of artificial life strongly differs from traditional modeling by studying not only "life as we know it" but also "life as it could be".

A traditional model of a biological system will focus on capturing its most important parameters. In contrast, an ALife modeling approach will generally seek to decipher the most simple and general principles underlying life and implement them in a simulation. The simulation then offers the possibility to analyse new and different lifelike systems.

Vladimir Georgievich Red'ko proposed to generalize this distinction to the modeling of any process, leading to the more general distinction of "processes as we know them" and "processes as they could be".

A central goal in the philosophy and modeling of artificial life is achieving Open-Ended Evolution (OEE). This refers to the capacity of a system to continually produce novel, complex, and adaptive behaviors or entities without reaching a stable equilibrium or predefined end-point. Researchers argue that OEE is a hallmark of natural life that current artificial systems have yet to fully replicate.

== Software-based ("soft") ==
=== Techniques ===
- Cellular automata were used in the early days of artificial life, and are still often used for ease of scalability and parallelization. ALife and cellular automata share a closely tied history.
- Artificial neural networks are sometimes used to model the brain of an agent. Although traditionally more of an artificial intelligence technique, neural nets can be important for simulating population dynamics of organisms that can learn. The symbiosis between learning and evolution is central to theories about the development of instincts in organisms with higher neurological complexity, as in, for instance, the Baldwin effect.
- Neuroevolution

==== Program-based ====
Program-based simulations contain organisms with a "genome" language. This language is more often in the form of a Turing complete computer program than actual biological DNA. Assembly derivatives are the most common languages used. An organism "lives" when its code is executed, and there are usually various methods allowing self-replication. Mutations are generally implemented as random changes to the code. Use of cellular automata is common but not required. Another example could be an artificial intelligence and multi-agent system/program.

==== Module-based ====
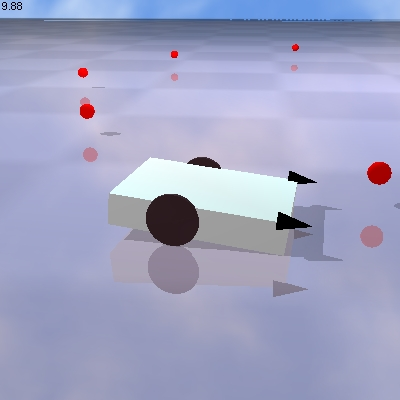
A Braitenberg vehicle, able to navigate by light detection

Individual modules are added to a creature. These modules modify the creature's behaviors and characteristics either directly, by hard coding into the simulation (leg type A increases speed and metabolism), or indirectly, through the emergent interactions between a creature's modules (leg type A moves up and down with a frequency of X, which interacts with other legs to create motion). Generally, these are simulators that emphasize user creation and accessibility over mutation and evolution.

==== Parameter-based ====
Organisms are generally constructed with pre-defined and fixed behaviors that are controlled by various parameters that mutate. That is, each organism contains a collection of numbers or other finite parameters. Each parameter controls one or several aspects of an organism in a well-defined way.

==== Neural net–based ====
These simulations have creatures that learn and grow using neural nets or a close derivative. Emphasis is often, although not always, on learning rather than on natural selection.

=== Complex systems modeling ===
Mathematical models of complex systems are of three types: black-box (phenomenological), white-box (mechanistic, based on the first principles) and grey-box (mixtures of phenomenological and mechanistic models). In black-box models, the individual-based (mechanistic) mechanisms of a complex dynamic system remain hidden.

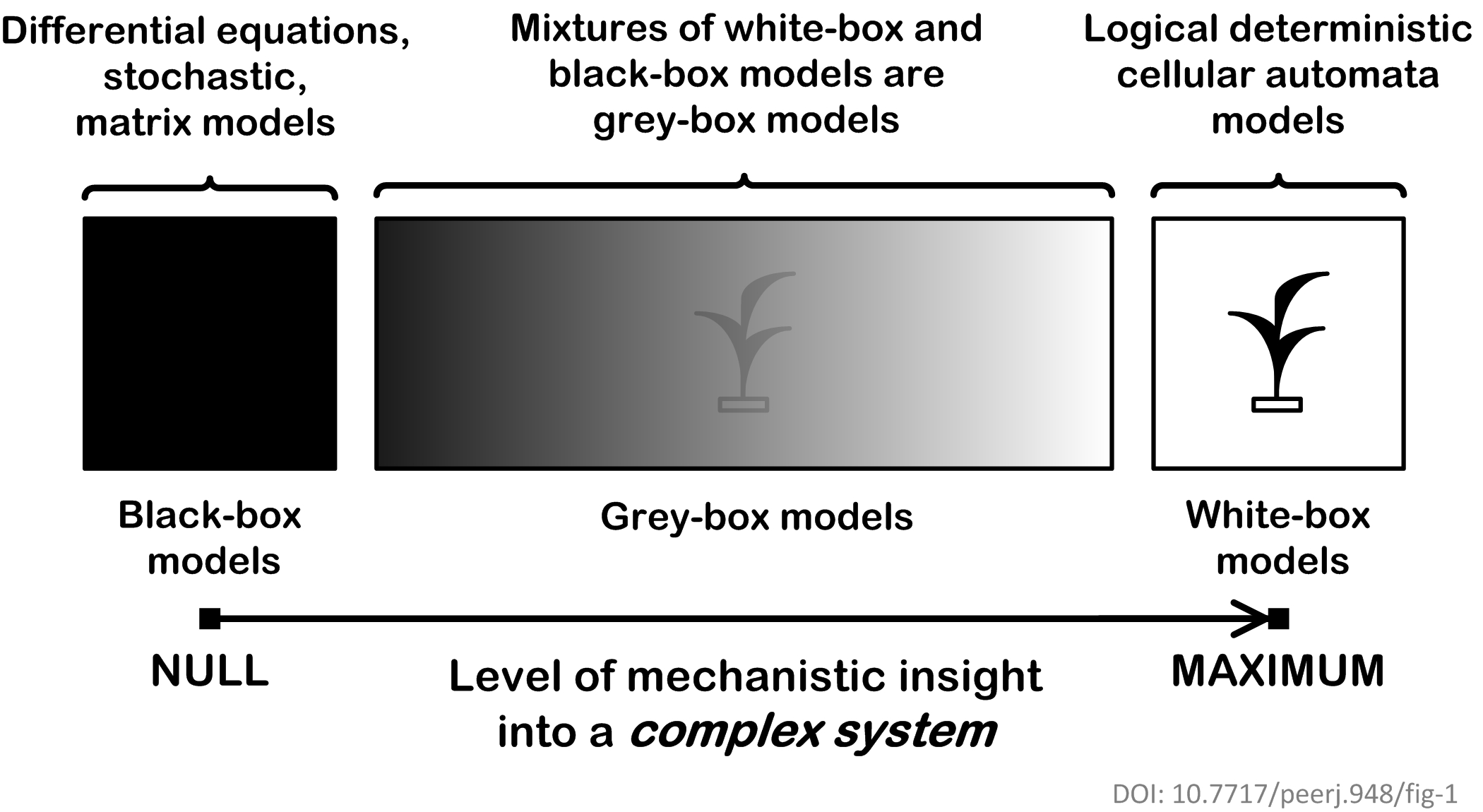
Mathematical models for complex systems

Black-box models are completely nonmechanistic. They are phenomenological and ignore a composition and internal structure of a complex system. Due to the non-transparent nature of the model, interactions of subsystems cannot be investigated. In contrast, a white-box model of a complex dynamic system has ‘transparent walls’ and directly shows underlying mechanisms. All events at the micro-, meso- and macro-levels of a dynamic system are directly visible at all stages of a white-box model's evolution. In most cases, mathematical modelers use the heavy black-box mathematical methods, which cannot produce mechanistic models of complex dynamic systems. Grey-box models are intermediate and combine black-box and white-box approaches.

Logical deterministic individual-based cellular automata model of single species population growth

Creation of a white-box model of complex system is associated with the problem of the necessity of an a priori basic knowledge of the modeling subject. The deterministic logical cellular automata are necessary but not sufficient condition of a white-box model. The second necessary prerequisite of a white-box model is the presence of the physical ontology of the object under study. The white-box modeling represents an automatic hyper-logical inference from the first principles because it is completely based on the deterministic logic and axiomatic theory of the subject. The purpose of the white-box modeling is to derive from the basic axioms a more detailed, more concrete mechanistic knowledge about the dynamics of the object under study. The necessity to formulate an intrinsic axiomatic system of the subject before creating its white-box model distinguishes the cellular automata models of white-box type from cellular automata models based on arbitrary logical rules. If cellular automata rules have not been formulated from the first principles of the subject, then such a model may have a weak relevance to the real problem.

Logical deterministic individual-based cellular automata model of interspecific competition for a single limited resource

=== Notable simulators ===
This is a list of artificial life and digital organism simulators:

List of notable simulators
Name	Driven By	Started	Ended
Polyworld	neural net	1990	ongoing
Tierra	evolvable code	1991	2004
Avida	evolvable code	1993	ongoing
TechnoSphere	modules	1995	
Framsticks	evolvable code	1996	ongoing
Creatures	neural net, simulated biochemistry & genetics	1996	2001
3D Virtual Creature Evolution	neural net	2008	NA
EcoSim	Fuzzy Cognitive Map	2009	ongoing
OpenWorm	Geppetto	2011	ongoing
Noble Ape/ApeSDK	hybrid simulation models	1996	ongoing
Lenia	continuous cellular automata	2019	ongoing

== Hardware-based ("hard") ==
Hardware-based artificial life mainly consist of robots, that is, automatically guided machines able to do tasks on their own.

== Biochemical-based ("wet") ==
Biochemical-based life is studied in the field of synthetic biology. It involves research such as the creation of synthetic DNA. The term "wet" is an extension of the term "wetware". Efforts toward "wet" artificial life focus on engineering live minimal cells from living bacteria Mycoplasma laboratorium and in building non-living biochemical cell-like systems from scratch.

In May 2019, researchers reported a new milestone in the creation of a new synthetic (possibly artificial) form of viable life, a variant of the bacteria Escherichia coli, by reducing the natural number of 64 codons in the bacterial genome to 59 codons instead, in order to encode 20 amino acids.

In 2020, Sam Kriegman and Douglas Blackiston reported the creation of a biological robot aided by artificial intelligence.

In 2021, the same team that developed Xenobots reported a further breakthrough: the first biological robots capable of kinematic self-replication. Unlike traditional biological reproduction (growth/birth), these synthetic organisms spontaneously collect loose cells in their environment to assemble new copies of themselves, a process previously seen only at the molecular level.

== Comparison to AI ==
Artificial intelligence has traditionally used a top down approach, while ALife generally works from the bottom up.

== Criticism ==
Artificial life has had a controversial history. John Maynard Smith criticized certain artificial life work in 1994 as "fact-free science". Mario Bunge criticized the ideas of strong artificial life as part of his wider critique of computationalism. He wrote that proponents of strong ALife are mistakenly erasing the distinction between a simulation and the process that is being simulated. He had no such objections to the weak ALife program.

== See also ==
- Artificial consciousness – Hypothetical consciousness in artificial systems
- Applications of artificial intelligence
- Autonomous robot – Robot that performs behaviors or tasks with a high degree of autonomy
- Bioethics – Study of the ethical issues emerging from advances in biology and medicine
- Complex adaptive system – System whose behavior is not automatically predictable from its parts
- Darwin machine – Type of iterative process
- Digital morphogenesis – Type of generative art
- Life simulation game – Subgenre of simulation video games
- Lindenmayer system – Rewriting system and type of formal grammar
- List of emerging technologies
- Mathematical and theoretical biology – Branch of biology
- Outline of artificial intelligence
- Player Project – Robot interface specification and software system
- Simulated reality – Concept of a false version of reality
- Social simulation – Research field that applies to methods of studying issues in social science
- Soda Constructor – Java based physics engine
- Universal Darwinism – Application of Darwinian theory to other fields
- Virtual pet – Type of artificial human companion
- Webots – Open-source robot simulator
- Agent-based modeling is used in artificial life and other fields to explore emergence in systems.
- Artificial chemistry started as a method within the ALife community to abstract the processes of chemical reactions.
- Evolutionary algorithms are a practical application of the weak ALife principle applied to optimization problems. Many optimization algorithms have been crafted which borrow from or closely mirror ALife techniques. The primary difference lies in explicitly defining the fitness of an agent by its ability to solve a problem, instead of its ability to find food, reproduce, or avoid death. The following is a list of evolutionary algorithms closely related to and used in ALife:
  - Ant colony optimization
  - Bacterial colony optimization
  - Genetic algorithm
  - Genetic programming
  - Swarm intelligence
- Multi-agent system – A multi-agent system is a computerized system composed of multiple interacting intelligent agents within an environment.
- Evolutionary art uses techniques and methods from artificial life to create new forms of art.
- Evolutionary music uses similar techniques, but applied to music instead of visual art.
- Abiogenesis and the origin of life sometimes employ ALife methodologies as well.
- Quantum artificial life applies quantum algorithms to artificial life systems.
