= TechnoSphere (virtual environment) =

Online digital environment

Part of the fractal landscape of TechnoSphere. The trees were positioned with a seeding algorithm created by Gordon Selley.

TechnoSphere was an online digital environment launched on September 1, 1995 and hosted on a computer at a UK university. Created by Jane Prophet and Dr. Gordon Selley, TechnoSphere was a place where users from around the globe could create creatures and release them into the 3D environment, described by the creators as a "digital ecology." Earlier incarnations of TechnoSphere did not have the advantage of web-accessible 3D graphics, but was still governed by chaos theory and similar algorithms that determined each creature's unique behavior based on their components and interactions with each other and their environment.

The online program was one of many digital artificial life simulations that evolved as the World Wide Web began to grow. Many museums and classrooms found the tool to be a valuable complement to learning material on natural selection and ecosystems. The experiment operated online until 2002. It was relaunched on January 15, 2007, but became offline again as of November 2012.

== Description ==
TechnoSphere was a real-time, 3D simulation of an environment that was populated by virtual creatures. Users across the globe had the capability to create their own creatures through a website. TechnoSphere III, one of many incarnations of the original design, used an artificial life program and fractal landscapes, which were governed by a complex set of rules and algorithms that determined how the virtual ecosystem reacted. The program was capable of modeling such concepts as simple evolution and carrying capacity. Despite limited available creature designs, no two would ever behave in the same way, due to chance interactions with its environment and other creatures.

Physically, the virtual landscape of TechnoSphere consisted of 16 km^{2} of terrain. It was capable of supporting approximately 4,000 creatures, though other sources suggest that as many as 20,000 creatures typically would coexist in the virtual environment at one time. After the relaunch, it was explicitly stated that the software limited the number of creatures at 200,000. Because each creature's behavior was unique, no single event could have been predicted, though some significant patterns developed. For example, even though there was no explicit flocking algorithm written into the program, creatures could be found organizing themselves into groups, most likely impelled by urges to mate and eat. The programs that supported the website were scalable, and could be modified to support a larger or smaller community of creatures.

=== Creatures ===
Some TechnoSphere creatures roaming around in the 3D environment.

Users accessing the site were able to create their own artificial life forms, building carnivores or herbivores from a select few component parts (heads, bodies, eyes, and wheels). Their "digital DNA" was linked to each component and the completed creature's attributes (speed, visual perception, rate of digestion, etc.) was determined by the combination of each feature's strengths and weaknesses—their "fitness for survival." Once a creature design was finished, users would name their digital creature, tag it with their e-mail address, and enter it into the digital environment.

There they chased or evaded each other, ate, grew, and mated. They also produced offspring, which were variants of the parents, sometimes incorporating aspects of both parents and other times favoring one parent creature's attributes over the others. General behavior patterns had emerged, but it was difficult to predict what was going to happen based solely on a creature's design. The one thing all TechnoSphere creatures did have in common was that they would all eventually die.

There was only one gender in TechnoSphere, so the creature that initiated mating was the parent that ended up carrying and caring for the offspring. Creature behavior was directed by a set of algorithms called Creature Comforts, designed by Julian Saunderson. It dictated, for example, that mating behavior (recombination of digital DNA) could only be initiated if both creatures' hunger was at least 50% satiated.

When significant events occurred in the TechnoSphere, a user's creature would send brief email messages "home." Users were also able to visit the website and view 2D snapshots of their creature, check family trees, "world" statistics, and search for other creatures and their users.

== Popularity ==
A screenshot of the web interface where users were able to choose creature components.

One report described the project's popularity by citing that the online version had attracted over a 100,000 users who had created 3,286,148 and growing creatures. Over the years in which the website was operating, the growing popularity facilitated necessary updates to the server software and hardware, causing website downtime and often slow response times.

=== Museums and education ===
Many museums and educators found the digital ecology interesting and some teachers even used TechnoSphere as a teaching tool. The technological innovations and digital images produced by the project were of such interest that temporary installations were put in at several museums, including the National Museum of Photography, Film and Television (now the National Media Museum) (Bradford, UK), Casula Powerhouse Arts Centre (Sydney, Australia), and the Donald R. and Joan F. Beall Center for Art and Technology at the University of California, Irvine (Irvine, California, [US). Museum visitors created creatures using touchscreen terminals and then released them immediately into the TechnoSphere. Once in the digital environment, the creatures could be observed within the world on a series of large projection screens, further expanding the popularity of the project.

== See also ==
- Digital organism simulator
