= Synthetic microbial consortia =

Engineered microbial groups for specific tasks

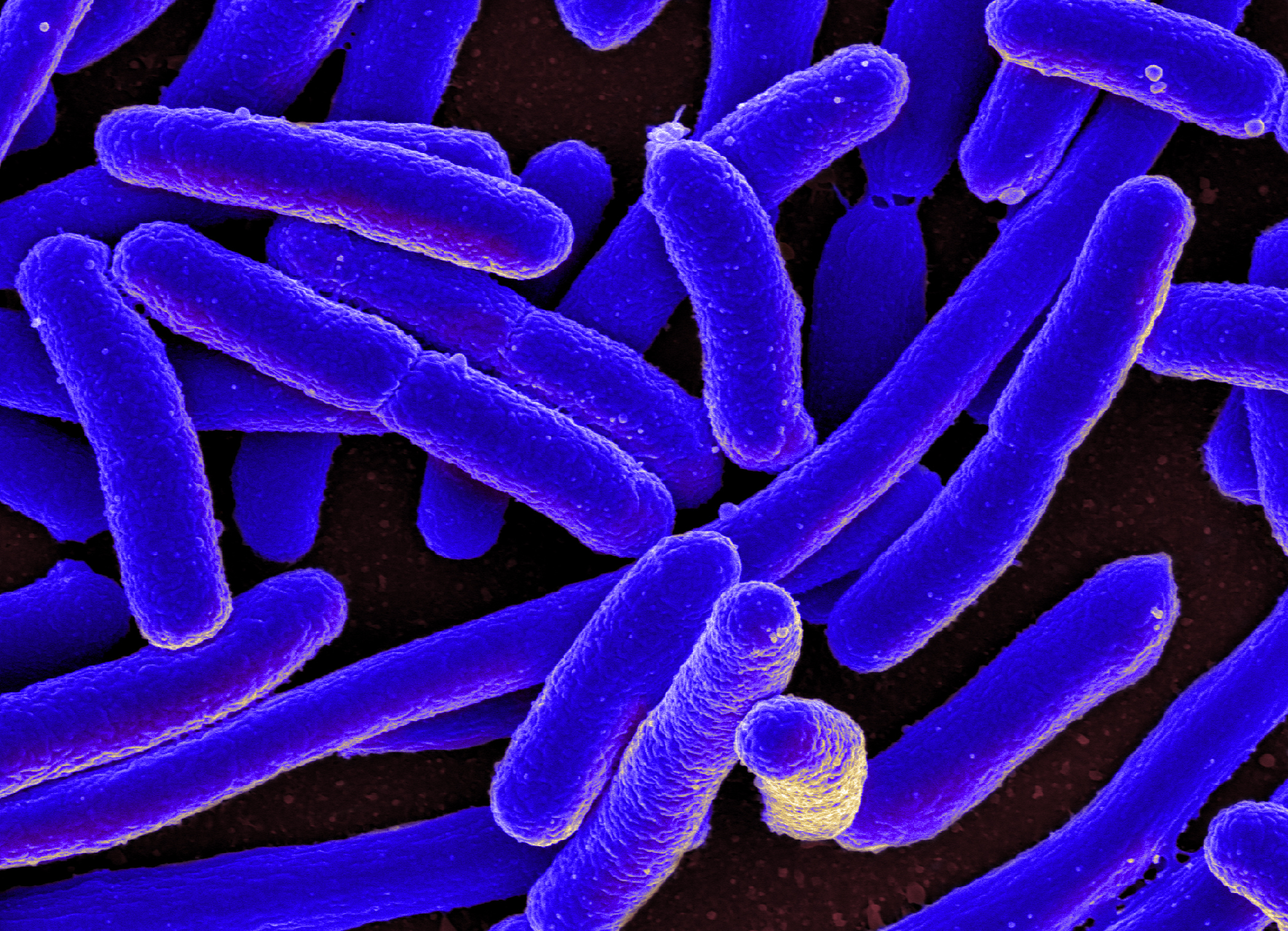
a TEM picture of E. coli, chemoheterotrophic bacteria often used in synthetic microbial consortia.

Synthetic microbial consortia or Synthetic microbial communities (commonly called SynComs) are multi-population systems that can contain a diverse range of microbial species, and are adjustable to serve a variety of industrial, ecological, and tautological interests. For synthetic biology, consortia take the ability to engineer novel cell behaviors to a population level.

Consortia are more common than not in nature, and generally prove to be more robust than monocultures. Just over 7,000 species of bacteria have been cultured and identified to date. Many of the estimated 1.2 million bacteria species that remain have yet to be cultured and identified, in part due to inabilities to be cultured axenically. Evidence for symbiosis between microbes strongly suggests it to have been a necessary precursor of the evolution of land plants and for their transition from algal communities in the sea to land. When designing synthetic consortia, or editing naturally occurring consortia, synthetic biologists keep track of pH, temperature, initial metabolic profiles, incubation times, growth rate, and other pertinent variables.

== Biofuel ==
One of the more salient applications of engineering behaviors and interactions between microbes in a community is the ability to combine or even switch metabolisms. The combination of autotrophic and heterotrophic microbes allows the unique possibility of a self-sufficient community that may produce desired biofuels to be collected. Co-culture dyads of autotrophic Synechococcus elongatus and heterotrophic Escherichia coli were found to be able to grow synchronously when the strain of S. elongatus was transformed to include a gene for sucrose export. The commensal combination of the sucrose-producing cyanobacteria with the modified E. coli metabolism may allow for a diverse array of metabolic products such as various butanol biofuels, terpenoids, and fatty-acid derived fuels.

Including a heterotroph also provides a solution to the issues of contamination when producing carbohydrates, as competition may limit contaminant species viability. In isolated systems this can be a restriction to the feasibility of large-scale biofuel operations, like algae ponds, where contamination can significantly reduce the desired output.

Through interactions between Geobacter spp. and methanogens from the soil in a rice paddy field, it was discovered that the use of interspecies electron transfer stimulated the production of methane. Considering the abundance of conductive metals in soils and the use of methane (natural gas) as a fuel, this may lead to a bioenergy-producing process.

== Bioremediation ==
Use of the extensive range of microbial metabolism offers opportunities to those interested in bioremediation. Through consortia, synthetic biologists have been able to design an enhanced efficiency in bacteria that can excrete bio-surfactants as well as degrade hydrocarbons for the interests of cleaning oil contamination in Assam, India. Their experiment took combinations of five native naturally occurring hydrocarbon-degrading bacteria, and analyzed the different cocktails to see which degraded poly-aromatic hydrocarbons the best. The combination of Bacillus pumilis KS2 and Bacillus cereus R2 was found to be the most effective, degrading 84.15% of the TPH after 5 weeks.

Further remediation efforts have turned to the issue of agricultural pesticide run-off. Pesticides vary in class and function, and in high concentration often lead to highly toxic environmental risks. Of the over-500 types of pesticides in current use, two serious issues are their general lack of biodegradability and unpredictability. In Kyrgyzstan, researchers assessed soil around a pesticide dump and discovered not only that the soil had poor microflora diversity, but that some of the species that were present used metabolic pathways to digest the pesticides. The two most-efficient species found were Pseudomonas fluorescens and Bacillus polymyxa, with B. polymyxa degrading 48.2% of the pesticide Aldrin after 12 days. However, when the strains were combined with each other as well as some other less-efficient yet native bacteria, pesticide degradation increased to 54.0% in the same conditions. Doolatkeldieva et al. discussed their findings, saying

"It is consequently possible that the degrading capacity of the bacteria could be increased only through co-cultivation, which shows that these bacteria naturally coexist and are dependent on each other for the utilization of environmental substances. In the oxidation and hydrolysis pathways of pesticide degradation, each bacterium can produce metabolites that will be utilized by the enzyme system of the next bacterium".

== Bioplastic ==
As an answer to the increase in use of non-biodegradable, oil-based plastics and its subsequent accumulation as waste, scientists have developed biodegradable and compostable alternatives often called bioplastics. However, not all biologically created plastics are necessarily biodegradable, and this can be a source of confusion. Therefore it is important to distinguish between the types of bioplastics, biodegradable bioplastics which can be degraded by some microflora and simply bio-based plastics which are a renewable source of plastic but require more effort to dispose of.

One of the bioplastics of interest is Polyhydroxybutyrate, abbreviated to PHB. PHB is a biodegradable bioplastic that has applications for food packaging due to being non-toxic. Repurposed E. coli, as well as Halomonas boliviensis, have been shown to produce PHB. PHB production starting from carbon dioxide in a co-culture between S. elongatus and H. boliviensis has proven to be a stable continually-productive pair for 5 months without the aid of antibiotics.

== See also ==
- Microbial consortium
