= Framsticks =

Software for simulation of artificial life

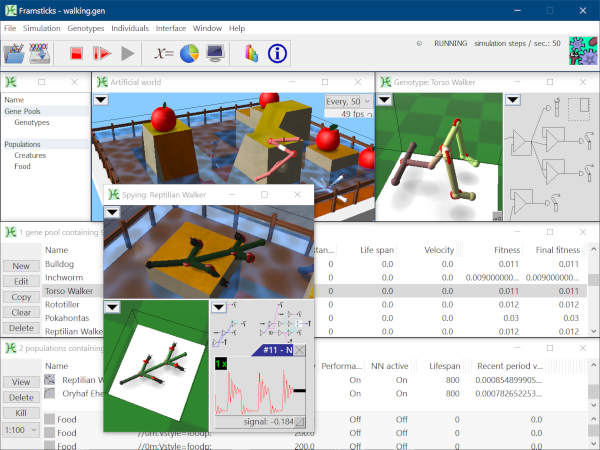
- Developers: Maciej Komosinski and Szymon Ulatowski
- Stable release: 5.2 / May 8, 2025
- Operating system: Microsoft Windows, Linux, macOS, iOS, Android
- Website: www.framsticks.com

Framsticks is a 3D freeware Artificial Life simulator. Organisms consisting of physical structures ("bodies") and control structures ("brains") evolve over time against a user's predefined fitness landscape (for instance, evolving for speed), or spontaneously coevolve in a complex environment. Evolution of organisms occurs primarily through artificial selection, where an intelligent selector chooses the selection parameters and mutation rates. Also the organisms rate of crossing-over can be chosen thus reflecting the sharing of genes by mating in nature. The simulated organisms have genetic scripts inspired by DNA found in living organisms in nature. A user can isolate a particular organism in the gene pool and edit its genotype. Framsticks allows users to design organisms or manually edit the living genetic code of an organism. Users have the ability to seed the environment with energy orbs that the organisms convert to energy and material. Depending on how the organism does in its lifespan determines the future of the virtual gene pool. Gene pools can be exported and shared.

== Bodies ==
The bodies are made up of various building blocks that are assembled according to a genetic script. Building blocks include: a rotator, hinge, muscle, structure, and receptor.

== Brains ==
The brains are neural networks that show up as a network of firing neurons. The genetic script serves as the blueprints for the exact assembly and functioning of the neural network.

== World ==
The world or ‘universe’ can be set to height-field editable as blocks and/or steep planes, ‘water’, flat, or a combination of all these and be edited by user as map in simple text-format. It has adjustable gravitation and water level.

== See also ==
- Digital organism
- Artificial life
- List of other Alife Simulators
