= Concerted activity =

Concerted activity may refer to:

- the concept of protected concerted activity in labor law
- one of the two types of tacit collusion
- combined effect of enzymes as in case of IRS1 and IGF1R
