= Cooperation (evolution) =

Groups of organisms acting for mutual benefit

In evolution, cooperation is the process where groups of organisms work or act together for common or mutual benefits. It is commonly defined as any adaptation that has evolved, at least in part, to increase the reproductive success of the actor's social partners. For example, territorial choruses by male lions discourage intruders and are likely to benefit all contributors.

This process contrasts with intragroup competition where individuals work against each other for selfish reasons. Cooperation exists not only in humans but in other animals as well. The diversity of taxa that exhibits cooperation is quite large, ranging from zebra herds to pied babblers to African elephants. Many animal and plant species cooperate with both members of their own species and with members of other species.

== In animals ==
Cooperation in animals appears to occur mostly for direct benefit or between relatives. Spending time and resources assisting a related individual may at first seem destructive to an organism's chances of survival but is actually beneficial over the long-term. Since relatives share part of the helper's genetic make-up, enhancing each individual's chance of survival may actually increase the likelihood that the helper's genetic traits will be passed on to future generations.

However, some researchers, such as ecology professor Tim Clutton-Brock, assert that cooperation is a more complex process. They state that helpers may receive more direct, and less indirect, gains from assisting others than is commonly reported. These gains include protection from predation and increased reproductive fitness. Furthermore, they insist that cooperation may not solely be an interaction between two individuals but may be part of the broader goal of unifying populations.

Prominent biologists, such as Charles Darwin, E. O. Wilson, and W. D. Hamilton, have found the evolution of cooperation fascinating because natural selection favors those who achieve the greatest reproductive success while cooperative behavior often decreases the reproductive success of the actor (the individual performing the cooperative behavior). Hence, cooperation seemed to pose a challenging problem to the theory of natural selection, which rests on the assumption that individuals compete to survive and maximize their reproductive successes. Additionally, some species have been found to perform cooperative behaviors that may at first sight seem detrimental to their own evolutionary fitness. For example, when a ground squirrel sounds an alarm call to warn other group members of a nearby coyote, it draws attention to itself and increases its own odds of being eaten. There have been multiple hypotheses for the evolution of cooperation, all of which are rooted in Hamilton's models based on inclusive fitness. These models hypothesize that cooperation is favored by natural selection due to either direct fitness benefits (mutually beneficial cooperation) or indirect fitness benefits (altruistic cooperation). As explained below, direct benefits encompass by-product benefits and enforced reciprocity, while indirect benefits (kin selection) encompass limited dispersal, kin discrimination and the greenbeard effect.

=== Kin selection ===
One specific form of cooperation in animals is kin selection, which involves animals promoting the reproductive success of their kin, thereby promoting their own fitness. (Note: An individual's gene complement (or genome) can be represented by the letters of the alphabet. Each letter is represented twice: A_{1} and A_{2}. This individual's genome therefore consists of 52 genes. The subscript indicates from which parent that copy of A has come. Mostly the two copies are identical, but occasionally they differ slightly. When this individual reproduces sexually, one or other copy of A (chosen randomly) is passed on to offspring-1, who gets its other copy of A from the sexual partner. The same happens with genes B, C, D, ..., Z. If we denote the two sexual partners by means of subscripts "m" and "f", then the genome of the offspring they produce might consist of A_{m2}/A_{f1}, B_{m2}/B_{f2}, C_{m1}/C_{f1}, D_{m1}/D_{f1} ... Z_{m1}/Z_{f2}. Each parent has contributed exactly half of the offspring's genome. So individual "m" shares only half of its genome with its offspring. Suppose individuals "m" and "f" produce a second offspring (offspring-2), whose genome is determined in exactly the same manner. There is a coin-flip 50% probability that offspring-2 will inherit the same copy of A from "m" as offspring-1 did (i.e. A_{m2}). This also applies to gene B and so on through the alphabet. If a coin-flip "heads" means that gene X is the same in offspring-1 as it is in offspring-2, then in 26 flips of the coin approximately half are going to be "heads" and the rest "tails", i.e. half the genes inherited from parent "m" will be the same in the two offspring. The same will happen to the genes inherited from parent "f". Thus of the 52 genes inherited from the two parents, on average, 13 + 13 = 26 (or half) will be identical in the two sibs. Thus sibs are genetically as similar to one another as a parent is to an offspring. From a evolutionary genetic point of view it is therefore as advantageous to help with the upbringing of full sibs as it is to produce and raise one's own offspring.)

Different theories explaining kin selection have been proposed, including the "pay-to-stay" and "territory inheritance" hypotheses. The "pay-to-stay" theory suggests that individuals help others rear offspring in order to return the favor of the breeders allowing them to live on their land. The "territory inheritance" theory contends that individuals help in order to have improved access to breeding areas once the breeders depart.

Studies conducted on red wolves support previous researchers' contention that helpers obtain both immediate and long-term gains from cooperative breeding. Researchers evaluated the consequences of red wolves' decisions to stay with their packs for extended periods of time after birth. While delayed dispersal helped other wolves' offspring, studies also found that it extended male helper wolves' life spans. This suggests that kin selection may not only benefit an individual in the long-term through increased fitness but also in the short-term through increased survival chances.

Some research suggests that individuals provide more help to closer relatives. This phenomenon is known as kin discrimination. In their meta-analysis, researchers compiled data on kin selection as mediated by genetic relatedness in 18 species, including the western bluebird, pied kingfisher, Australian magpie, and dwarf mongoose. They found that different species exhibited varying degrees of kin discrimination, with the largest frequencies occurring among those who have the most to gain from cooperative interactions.

== In plants ==
Cooperation exists not only in animals but also in plants. In a greenhouse experiment with Ipomoea hederacea, a climbing plant, results show that kin groups have higher efficiency rates in growth than non-kin groups do. This is expected to rise out of reduced competition within the kin groups.

== Explanation ==
The inclusive fitness theory provides a good overview of possible solutions to the fundamental problem of cooperation. The theory is based on the hypothesis that cooperation helps in transmitting underlying genes to future generations either through increasing the reproductive successes of the individual (direct fitness) or of other individuals who carry the same genes (indirect fitness). Direct benefits can result from simple by-product of cooperation or enforcement mechanisms, while indirect benefits can result from cooperation with genetically similar individuals.

=== Direct fitness benefits ===
This is also called mutually beneficial cooperation as both actor and recipient depend on direct fitness benefits, which are broken down into two different types: by-product benefit and enforcement.

By-product benefit arises as a consequence of social partners having a shared interest in cooperation. For example, in meerkats, larger group size provides a benefit to all the members of that group by increasing survival rates, foraging success and conflict wins. This is because living in groups is better than living alone, and cooperation arises passively as a result of many animals doing the same thing. By-product benefit can also arise as a consequence of subordinate animals staying and helping a nest that is dominated by leaders who often suffer high mortality rates. It has been shown that cooperation would be most advantageous for the sex that is more likely to remain and breed in the natal group. This is because the subordinate will have a higher chance to become dominant in the group as time passes. Cooperation in this scenario is often seen between non-related members of the same species, such as the wasp Polistes dominula.

Prisoner's Delight, another term to describe by-product benefit, is a term coined by Kenneth Binmore in 2007 after he found that benefits can result as an automatic consequence of an otherwise "self-interested" act in cooperative hunting. He illustrated this with a scenario having two hunters, each hunter having the choice of hunting (cooperate) or not hunting (free-riding). Assuming that cooperative hunting results in greater rewards than just a one-player hunt, when hunting is not rare, both hunters and non-hunters benefit because either player is likely to be with other hunters, and thus likely to reap the rewards of a successful hunt. This situation demonstrates "Prisoner's Delight" because the food of a successful hunt is shared between the two players regardless of whether or not they participated.

It has been shown that free riding, or reaping the benefits without any effort, is often a problem in collective action. Examples of free riding would be if an employee in a labor union pays no dues, but still benefits from union representation. In a study published in 1995, scientists found that female lions showed individual differences in the extent to which they participated in group-territorial conflict. Some lions consistently 'cooperated' by approaching intruders, while others 'lagged' behind to avoid the risk of fighting. Although the lead female recognized the laggards, she failed to punish them, suggesting that cooperation is not maintained by reciprocity.

Cooperation is maintained in situations where free-riding is a problem through enforcement, which is the mechanism where the actor is rewarded for cooperating or punished for not cooperating. This happens when cooperation is favored in aiding those who have helped the actors in the past. Punishment for noncooperation has been documented in meerkats, where dominant females will attack and evict subordinate females who become pregnant. The pregnancy is seen as a failure to cooperate because only the dominant females are allowed to bear offspring. Dominant females will attack and kill the offspring of subordinate females if they evade eviction and eviction often leads to increased stress and decreased survival.

Enforcement can also be mutually beneficial, and is often called reciprocal cooperation because the act of cooperation is preferentially directed at individuals who have helped the actor in the past (directly), or helped those who have helped the actor in the past (indirectly).

=== Indirect fitness benefits ===
The second class of explanations for cooperation is indirect fitness benefits, or altruistic cooperation. There are three major mechanisms that generate this type of fitness benefit: limited dispersal, kin discrimination and the green-beard effect.

Hamilton originally suggested that high relatedness could arise in two ways: direct kin recognition between individuals or limited dispersal, or population viscosity, which can keep relatives together. The easiest way to generate relatedness between social partners is limited dispersal, a mechanism in which genetic similarity correlates with spatial proximity. If individuals do not move far, then kin usually surrounds them. Hence, any act of altruism would be directed primarily towards kin. This mechanism has been shown in Pseudomonas aeruginosa bacteria, where cooperation is disfavored when populations are well mixed, but favored when there is high local relatedness.

Kin discrimination also influences cooperation because the actor can give aid preferentially towards related partners. Since kin usually share common genes, it is thought that this nepotism can lead to genetic relatedness between the actor and the partner's offspring, which affects the cooperation an actor might give.

This mechanism is similar to what happens with the green-beard effect, but with the green-beard effect, the actor has to instead identify which of its social partners share the gene for cooperation. A green-beard system must always co-occur within individuals and alleles to produce a perceptible trait, recognition of this trait in others, and preferential treatment to those recognized. Examples of green-beard behavior have been found in hydrozoans, slime molds, yeast, and ants. An example is in side-blotch lizards, where blue-throated males preferentially establish territories next to each other. Results show that neighboring blue-throats are more successful at mate guarding. However, blue males next to larger, more aggressive orange males suffer a cost. This strategy blue has evolutionary cycles of altruism alternating with mutualism tied to the RPS game.

== Multi-level selection ==
Multi-level selection theory suggests that selection operates on more than one level: for example, it may operate at an atomic and molecular level in cells, at the level of cells in the body, and then again at the whole organism level, and the community level, and the species level. Any level which is not competitive with others of the same level will be eliminated, even if the level below is highly competitive. A classic example is that of genes which prevent cancer. Cancer cells divide uncontrollably, and at the cellular level, they are very successful, because they are (in the short term) reproducing very well and out competing other cells in the body. However, at the whole organism level, cancer is often fatal, and so may prevent reproduction. Therefore, changes to the genome which prevent cancer (for example, by causing damaged cells to act co-operatively by destroying themselves) are favoured. Multi-level selection theory contends that similar effects can occur, for example, to cause individuals to co-operate to avoid behaviours which favour themselves short-term, but destroy the community (and their descendants) long term.

== Market effect ==
One theory suggesting a mechanism that could lead to the evolution of co-operation is the "market effect" as suggested by Noe and Hammerstein. The mechanism relies on the fact that in many situations there exists a trade-off between efficiency obtaining a desired resource and the amount of resources one can actively obtain. In that case, each partner in a system could benefit from specializing in producing one specific resource and obtaining the other resource by trade. When only two partners exist, each can specialize in one resource, and trade for the other. Trading for the resource requires co-operation with the other partner and includes a process of bidding and bargaining.

This mechanism can be relied to both within a species or social group and within species systems. It can also be applied to a multi-partner system, in which the owner of a resource has the power to choose its co-operation partner. This model can be applied in natural systems (examples exist in the world of apes, cleaner fish, and more). Easy for exemplifying, though, are systems from international trading. Arabic countries control vast amounts of oil, but seek technologies from western countries. These in turn are in need of Arab oil. The solution is co-operation by trade.

== Symbiosis ==
Symbiosis refers to two or more biological species that interact closely, often over a long period of time. Symbiosis includes three types of interactions—mutualism, commensalism, and parasitism—of which only mutualism can sometimes qualify as cooperation. Mutualism involves a close, mutually beneficial interaction between two different biological species, whereas "cooperation" is a more general term that can involve looser interactions and can be interspecific (between species) or intraspecific (within a species). In commensalism, one of the two participating species benefits, while the other is neither harmed nor benefitted. In parasitism, one of the two participating species benefits at the expense of the other.

Symbiosis may be obligate or facultative. In obligate symbiosis, one or both species depends on the other for survival. In facultative symbiosis, the symbiotic interaction is not necessary for the survival of either species.

Two special types of symbiosis include endosymbiosis, in which one species lives inside of another, and ectosymbiosis, in which one species lives on another.

=== Mutualism ===
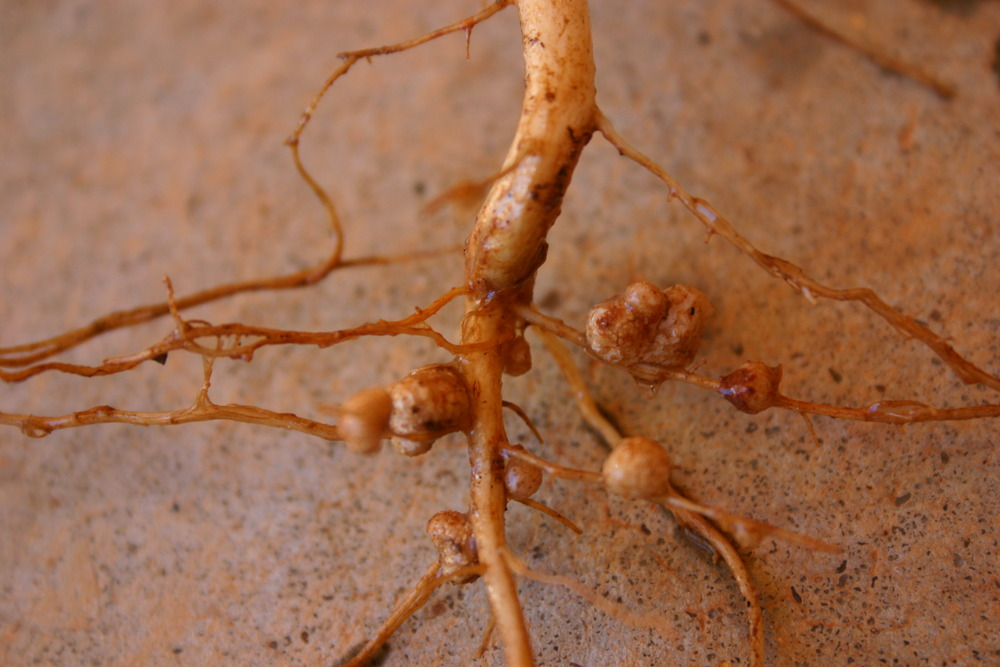
Rhizobia nodules on Vigna unguiculata

Mutualism is a form of symbiosis in which both participating species benefit.

A classic example of mutualism is the interaction between rhizobia soil bacteria and legumes (Fabaceae). In this interaction, rhizobia bacteria induce root nodule formation in legume plants via an exchange of molecular signals. Within the root nodules, rhizobia fix atmospheric nitrogen into ammonia using the nitrogenase enzyme. The legume benefits from a new supply of usable nitrogen from the rhizobia, and the rhizobia benefits from organic acid energy sources from the plant as well as the protection provided by the root nodule. Since the rhizobia live within the legume, this is an example of endosymbiosis, and since both the bacteria and the plant can survive independently, it is also an example of facultative symbiosis.

Lichens are another example of mutualism. Lichens consist of a fungus (the mycobiont) and a photosynthetic partner (the photobiont), which is usually a green alga or a cyanobacteria. The mycobiont benefits from the sugar products of photosynthesis generated by the photobiont, and the photobiont benefits from the increased water retention and increased surface area to capture water and mineral nutrients conferred by the mycobiont. Many lichens are examples of obligate symbiosis. In fact, one-fifth of all known extant fungal species form obligate symbiotic associations with green algae, cyanobacteria or both.

Not all examples of mutualism are also examples of cooperation. Specifically, in by-product mutualism, both participants benefit, but cooperation is not involved. For example, when an elephant defecates, this is beneficial to the elephant as a way to empty waste, and it is also beneficial to a dung beetle that uses the elephant's dung. However, neither participant's behavior yields a benefit from the other, and thus cooperation is not taking place.

== Hidden benefits ==
Hidden benefits are benefits from cooperation that are not obvious because they are obscure or delayed. (For example, a hidden benefit would not involve an increase in the number of offspring or offspring viability.)

One example of a hidden benefit involves Malarus cyaneus, the superb fairy-wren. In M. cyaneus, the presence of helpers at the nest does not lead to an increase in chick mass. However, the presence of helpers does confer a hidden benefit: it increases the chance that a mother will survive to breed in the next year.

Another example of a hidden benefit is indirect reciprocity, in which a donor individual helps a beneficiary to increase the probability that observers will invest in the donor in the future, even when the donor will have no further interaction with the beneficiary.

In a study of 79 students, participants played a game in which they could repeatedly give money to others and receive from others. They were told that they would never interact with the same person in the reciprocal role. A player's history of donating was displayed at each anonymous interaction, and donations were significantly more frequent to receivers who had been generous to others in earlier interactions. Indirect reciprocity has only been shown to occur in humans.

== Prisoner's dilemma ==
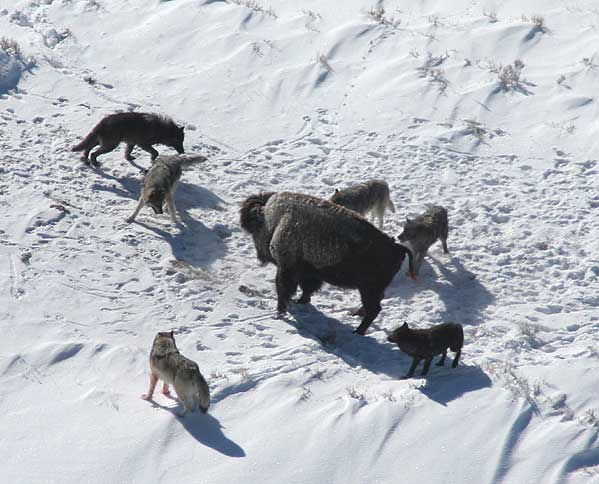
Cooperative hunting by wolves allows them to tackle much larger and more nutritious prey than any individual wolf could handle. However, such cooperation could, potentially, be exploited by selfish individuals who do not expose themselves to the dangers of the hunt, but nevertheless share in the spoils.

Even if all members of a group benefit from cooperation, individual self-interest may not favor cooperation. The prisoner's dilemma codifies this problem and has been the subject of much research, both theoretical and experimental. In its original form the prisoner's dilemma game (PDG) described two awaiting trial prisoners, A and B, each faced with the choice of betraying the other or remaining silent. The "game" has four possible outcomes: (a) they both betray each other, and are both sentenced to two years in prison; (b) A betrays B, which sets A free and B is sentenced to four years in prison; (c) B betrays A, with the same result as (b) except that it is B who is set free and the other spends four years in jail; (d) both remain silent, resulting in a six-month sentence each. Clearly (d) ("cooperation") is the best mutual strategy, but from the point of view of the individual betrayal is unbeatable (resulting in being set free, or getting only a two-year sentence). Remaining silent results in a four-year or six-month sentence. This is exemplified by a further example of the PDG: two strangers attend a restaurant together and decide to split the bill. The mutually best ploy would be for both parties to order the cheapest items on the menu (mutual cooperation). But if one member of the party exploits the situation by ordering the most expensive items, then it is best for the other member to do likewise. In fact, if the fellow diner's personality is completely unknown, and the two diners are unlikely ever to meet again, it is always in one's own best interests to eat as expensively as possible. Situations in nature that are subject to the same dynamics (rewards and penalties) as the PDG define cooperative behavior: it is never in the individual's fitness interests to cooperate, even though mutual cooperation rewards the two contestants (together) more highly than any other strategy. As described in the Nash equilibrium, cooperation cannot evolve under these circumstances.

However, in 1981 Axelrod and Hamilton noted that if the same contestants in the PDG meet repeatedly (in the so-called iterated prisoner's dilemma game, IPD) then tit-for-tat (foreshadowed by Robert Trivers' 1971 reciprocal altruism theory) is a robust strategy which promotes altruism. In "tit-for-tat" both players' opening moves are cooperation. Thereafter each contestant repeats the other player's last move, resulting in a seemingly endless sequence of mutually cooperative moves. However, mistakes severely undermine tit-for-tat's effectiveness, giving rise to prolonged sequences of betrayal, which can only be rectified by another mistake. Since these initial discoveries, all the other possible IPD game strategies have been identified (16 possibilities in all, including, for instance, "generous tit-for-tat", which behaves like "tit-for-tat", except that it cooperates with a small probability when the opponent's last move was "betray".), but all can be outperformed by at least one of the other strategies, should one of the players switch to such a strategy. The result is that none is evolutionarily stable, and any prolonged series of the iterated prisoner's dilemma game, in which alternative strategies arise at random, gives rise to a chaotic sequence of strategy changes that never ends.

Results from experimental economics show, however, that humans often act more cooperatively than strict self-interest would dictate.

== Evolutionary mechanisms suggesting that reciprocity is the result, not the cause, of the evolution of cooperation ==
In the light of the iterated prisoner's dilemma game and the reciprocal altruism theory failing to provide full answers to the evolutionary stability of cooperation, several alternative explanations have been proposed.

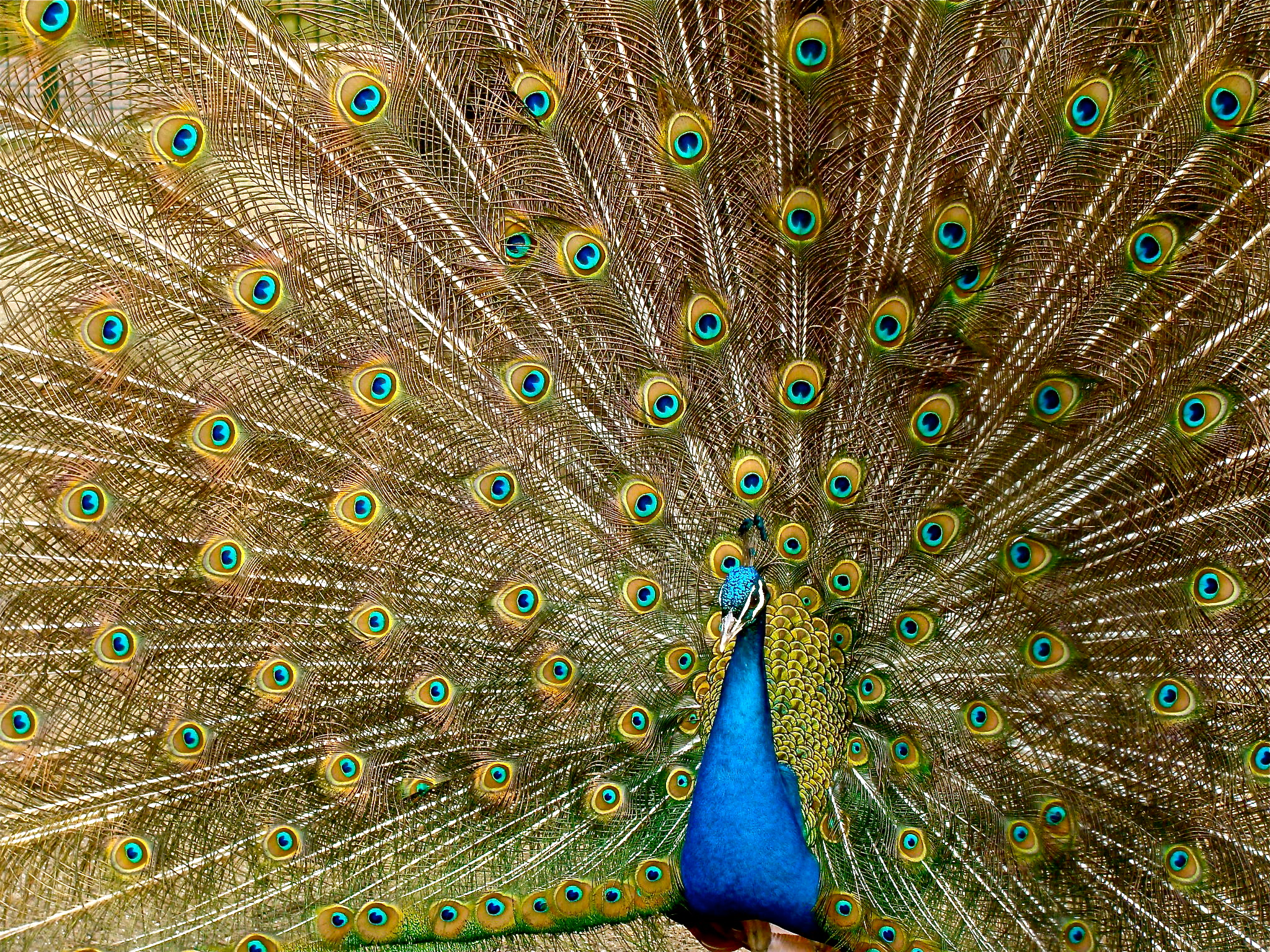
A male peacock with its beautiful but clumsy, aerodynamically unsound erectile tail, which Amotz Zahavi believes is a handicap, comparable to a race horse's handicap. The larger the handicap the more intrinsically fit the individual (see text).

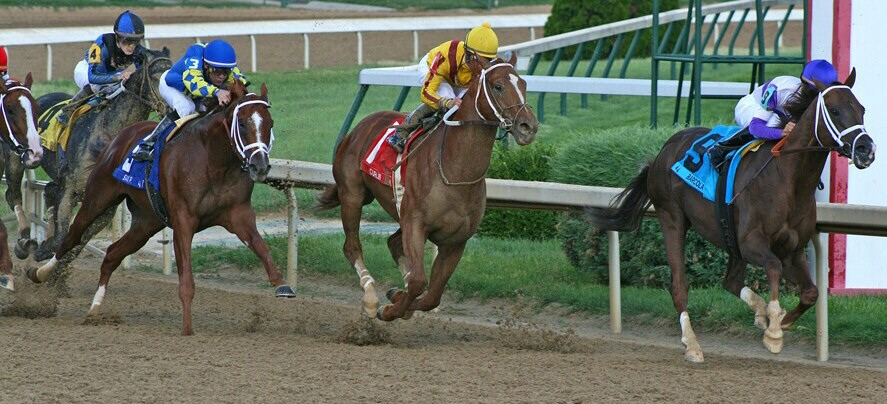
The best horses in a handicap race carry the largest weights, so the size of the handicap is a measure of the animal's quality.

There are striking parallels between cooperative behavior and exaggerated sexual ornaments displayed by some animals, particularly certain birds, such as, amongst others, the peacock. Both are costly in fitness terms, and both are generally conspicuous to other members of the population or species. This led Amotz Zahavi to suggest that both might be fitness signals rendered evolutionarily stable by his handicap principle. If a signal is to remain reliable, and generally resistant to falsification, the signal has to be evolutionarily costly. Thus, if a (low fitness) liar were to use the highly costly signal, which seriously eroded its real fitness, it would find it difficult to maintain a semblance or normality. Zahavi borrowed the term "handicap principle" from sports handicapping systems. These systems are aimed at reducing disparities in performance, thereby making the outcome of contests less predictable. In a horse handicap race, provenly faster horses are given heavier weights to carry under their saddles than inherently slower horses. Similarly, in amateur golf, better golfers have fewer strokes subtracted from their raw scores than the less talented players. The handicap therefore correlates with unhandicapped performance, making it possible, if one knows nothing about the horses, to predict which unhandicapped horse would win an open race. It would be the one handicapped with the greatest weight in the saddle. The handicaps in nature are highly visible, and therefore a peahen, for instance, would be able to deduce the health of a potential mate by comparing its handicap (the size of the peacock's tail) with those of the other males. The loss of the male's fitness caused by the handicap is offset by his increased access to females, which is as much of a fitness concern as is his health. A cooperative act is, by definition, similarly costly (e.g. helping raise the young at the nest of an unrelated pair of birds versus producing and raising one's own offspring). It would therefore also signal fitness, and is probably as attractive to females as a physical handicap. If this is the case, cooperation is evolutionarily stabilized by sexual selection.

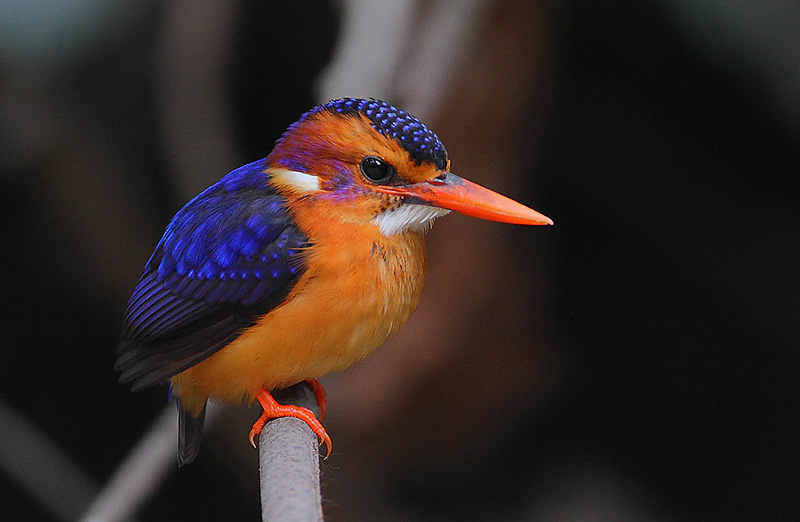
An African pygmy kingfisher, showing details of appearance and coloration that are shared by all African pygmy kingfishers to a high degree of fidelity.

There is an alternate strategy for identifying fit mates which does not rely on one gender having exaggerated sexual ornaments or other handicaps, but is probably generally applicable to most, if not all sexual creatures. It derives from the concept that the change in appearance and functionality caused by a non-silent mutation will generally stand out in a population. This is because that altered appearance and functionality will be unusual, peculiar, and different from the norm within that population. The norm against which these unusual features are judged is made up of fit attributes that have attained their plurality through natural selection, while less well adapted attributes will be in the minority or frankly rare. Since the overwhelming majority of mutant features are maladaptive, and it is impossible to predict evolution's future direction, sexual creatures would be expected to prefer mates with the fewest unusual or minority features. This will have the effect of a sexual population rapidly shedding peripheral phenotypic features, thereby canalizing the entire outward appearance and behavior of all of its members. They will all very quickly begin to look remarkably similar to one another in every detail, as illustrated in the accompanying photograph of the African pygmy kingfisher, Ispidina picta. Once a population has become as homogeneous in appearance as is typical of most species, its entire repertoire of behaviors will also be rendered evolutionarily stable, including any cooperative, altruistic and social interactions. Thus, in the example above of the selfish individual who hangs back from the rest of the hunting pack, but who nevertheless joins in the spoils, that individual will be recognized as being different from the norm, and will therefore find it difficult to attract a mate (koinophilia). Its genes will therefore have only a very small probability of being passed on to the next generation, thus evolutionarily stabilizing cooperation and social interactions at whatever level of complexity is the norm in that population.

== History of cooperation research ==
One of the first references to animal cooperation was made by Charles Darwin, who noted it as a potential problem for his theory of natural selection. In most of the 19th century, intellectuals like Thomas Henry Huxley and Peter Kropotkin debated fervently on whether animals cooperate with one another and whether animals displayed altruistic behaviors.

In the late 1900s, some early research in animal cooperation focused on the benefits of group-living. While living in a group produces costs in the form of increased frequency of predator attacks and greater mating competition, some animals find that the benefits outweigh the costs. Animals that practice group-living often benefit from assistance in parasite removal, access to more mates, and conservation of energy in foraging. Initially, the most obvious form of animal cooperation was kin selection, but more recent studies focus on non-kin cooperation, where benefits may seem less obvious. Non-kin cooperation often involves many strategies that include manipulation and coercion, making these interactions more complicated to study. An example of manipulation is presented by the cuckoo, a brood parasite, which lays its eggs in the nest of a bird of another species. That bird then is tricked into feeding and caring for the cuckoo offspring. Although this phenomenon may look like cooperation at first glance, it only presents benefits to one recipient.

In the past, simple game theory models, such as the classic cooperative hunting and Prisoner's dilemma models, were used to determine decisions made by animals in cooperative relationships. However, complicated interactions between animals have required the use of more complex economic models such as the Nash equilibrium. The Nash equilibrium is a type of non-cooperative game theory that assumes an individual's decision is influenced by its knowledge of the strategies of other individuals. This theory was novel because it took into consideration the higher cognitive capabilities of animals. The evolutionarily stable strategy is a refined version of the Nash equilibrium in that it assumes strategies are heritable and are subject to natural selection. Economic models are useful for analyzing cooperative relationships because they provide predictions on how individuals act when cooperation is an option. Economic models are not perfect, but they provide a general idea of how cooperative relationships work.

Contrary to the mainstream dogma, a recently published article. using agent-based models demonstrates that several crucial mechanisms, such as kin selection, punishment, multilevel selection, and spatial structure, cannot rescue the evolution of cooperation. The new findings revive a long-standing puzzle in the evolution theory. In addition, the work has potential therapeutic benefits for numerous incurable diseases.

== See also ==
- Agreeableness
- Collaboration
- Dunbar's number
- Evolution of cooperation
- Management cybernetics
- Microbial Cooperation
- Mutual Aid: A Factor of Evolution by Peter Kropotkin
- Polytely
- Teamwork
