= Microbial intelligence =

Adaptive behavior by microscopic organisms including bacteria and protists

Microbial intelligence (known as bacterial intelligence) is the intelligence shown by microorganisms. This includes complex adaptive behavior shown by single cells, and altruistic or cooperative behavior in populations of like or unlike cells. It is often mediated by chemical signalling that induces physiological or behavioral changes in cells and influences colony structures.

Complex cells, like protozoa or algae, show remarkable abilities to organize themselves in changing circumstances. Shell-building by amoebae reveals complex discrimination and manipulative skills that are ordinarily thought to occur only in multicellular organisms.

Even bacteria can display more behavior as a population. These behaviors occur in single species populations, or mixed species populations. Examples are colonies or swarms of myxobacteria, quorum sensing, and biofilms.

It has been suggested that a bacterial colony loosely mimics a biological neural network. The bacteria can take inputs in form of chemical signals, process them and then produce output chemicals to signal other bacteria in the colony.

Bacteria communication and self-organization in the context of network theory has been investigated by Eshel Ben-Jacob research group at Tel Aviv University which developed a fractal model of bacterial colony and identified linguistic and social patterns in colony lifecycle.

== Examples of microbial intelligence ==
=== Bacterial ===
- Bacterial biofilms can emerge through the collective behavior of thousands or millions of cells
- Biofilms formed by Bacillus subtilis can use electric signals (ion transmission) to synchronize growth so that the innermost cells of the biofilm do not starve.
- Under nutritional stress bacterial colonies can organize themselves in such a way so as to maximize nutrient availability.
- Bacteria reorganize themselves under antibiotic stress.
- Bacteria can swap genes (such as genes coding antibiotic resistance) between members of mixed species colonies.
- Individual cells of myxobacteria coordinate to produce complex structures or move as social entities. Myxobacteria move and feed cooperatively in predatory groups, known as swarms or wolf packs, with multiple forms of signalling and several polysaccharides play an important role.
- Populations of bacteria use quorum sensing to judge their own densities and change their behaviors accordingly. This occurs in the formation of biofilms, infectious disease processes, and the light organs of bobtail squid.
- For any bacterium to enter a host's cell, the cell must display receptors to which bacteria can adhere and be able to enter the cell. Some strains of E. coli are able to internalize themselves into a host's cell even without the presence of specific receptors as they bring their own receptor to which they then attach and enter the cell.
- Under nutrient limitation, some bacteria transform into endospores to resist heat and dehydration.
- A huge array of microorganisms have the ability to overcome being recognized by the immune system as they change their surface antigens so that any defense mechanisms directed against previously present antigens are now useless with the newly expressed ones.
- In April 2020 it was reported that collectives of bacteria have a membrane potential-based form of working memory. When scientists shone light onto a biofilm of bacteria optical imprints lasted for hours after the initial stimulus as the light-exposed cells responded differently to oscillations in membrane potentials due to changes to their potassium channels.

=== Protists ===
- Individual cells of cellular slime moulds coordinate to produce complex structures or move as multicellular entities. Biologist John Bonner pointed out that although slime molds are "no more than a bag of amoebae encased in a thin slime sheath, they manage to have various behaviors that are equal to those of animals who possess muscles and nerves with ganglia -- that is, simple brains."
- The single-celled ciliate Stentor roeselii expresses a sort of "behavioral hierarchy" and can 'change its mind' if its response to an irritant does not relieve the irritant, implying a very speculative sense of 'cognition'.
- Paramecium, specifically P. caudatum, is capable of learning to associate intense light with stimulus such as electric shocks in its swimming medium; although it appears to be unable to associate darkness with electric shocks.
- Protozoan ciliate Tetrahymena has the capacity to 'memorize' the geometry of its swimming area. Cells that were separated and confined in a droplet of water, recapitulated circular swimming trajectories upon release. This may result mainly from a rise in intracellular calcium.

== Applications ==
=== Bacterial colony optimisation ===
Bacterial colony optimization is an algorithm used in evolutionary computing. The algorithm is based on a lifecycle model that simulates some typical behaviors of E. coli bacteria during their whole lifecycle, including chemotaxis, communication, elimination, reproduction, and migration.

=== Slime mold computing ===
Logical circuits can be built with slime moulds. Distributed systems experiments have used them to approximate motorway graphs. The slime mould Physarum polycephalum is able to solve the Traveling Salesman Problem, a combinatorial test with exponentially increasing complexity, in linear time.

=== Soil ecology ===
Microbial community intelligence is found in soil ecosystems in the form of interacting adaptive behaviors and metabolisms. According to Ferreira et al., "Soil microbiota has its own unique capacity to recover from change and to adapt to the present state[...] [This] capacity to recover from change and to adapt to the present state by altruistic, cooperative and co-occurring behavior is considered a key attribute of microbial community intelligence."

Many bacteria that exhibit complex behaviors or coordination are heavily present in soil in the form of biofilms. Micropredators that inhabit soil, including social predatory bacteria, have significant implications for its ecology. Soil biodiversity, managed in part by these micropredators, is of significant importance for carbon cycling and ecosystem functioning.

The complicated interaction of microbes in the soil has been proposed as a potential carbon sink. Bioaugmentation has been suggested as a method to increase the 'intelligence' of microbial communities, that is, adding the genomes of autotrophic, carbon-fixing or nitrogen-fixing bacteria to their metagenome.

=== Bacterial transformation ===
Bacterial transformation is a form of microbial intelligence that involves complex adaptive cooperative behavior. About 80 species of bacteria have so far been identified that are likely capable of transformation, including about equal numbers of Gram-positive and Gram-negative bacteria.

=== Vibrio cholerae ===
V. cholerae has the ability to communicate strongly at the cellular level for the purpose of bacterial transformation, and this form of microbial intelligence involves cooperative quorum-sensing. Two different stimuli that are encountered in the small intestine, the absence of oxygen and the presence of host-produced bile salts, stimulate V. cholerae quorum sensing and thus its pathogenicity. Cooperative quorum sensing, involving microbial intelligence, facilitates natural genetic transformation, a process in which extracellular DNA is taken up by (competent) V. cholerae cells. V. cholerae is a bacterial pathogen that causes cholera with severe contagious diarrhea that affects millions of people globally.

=== Streptococcus pneumoniae ===
S. pneumoniae uses a cooperative complex quorum sensing system, a form of microbial intelligence, for regulating the release of bacteriocins as well as for differentiating into the competent state necessary for natural genetic transformation. The competent state is induced by a peptide pheromone. The induction of competence results in the release of DNA from a sub-fraction of S. pneumoniae cells in the population, probably by cell lysis. Subsequently the majority of the S. pneumoniae cells that have been induced to competence act as recipients and take up the DNA that is released by the donors. Natural transformation in S. pneumoniae is an adaptive form of microbial intelligence for promoting genetic recombination that appears to be similar to sex in higher organisms. S. pneumoniae is responsible for the death of more than a million people yearly.

== See also ==
- Collective intelligence
- Stigmergy
- Emergence
- Microbial cooperation
- Swarm intelligence
- Synthetic biology
- Self-organization
- Multi-agent system
