= Digital ecology =

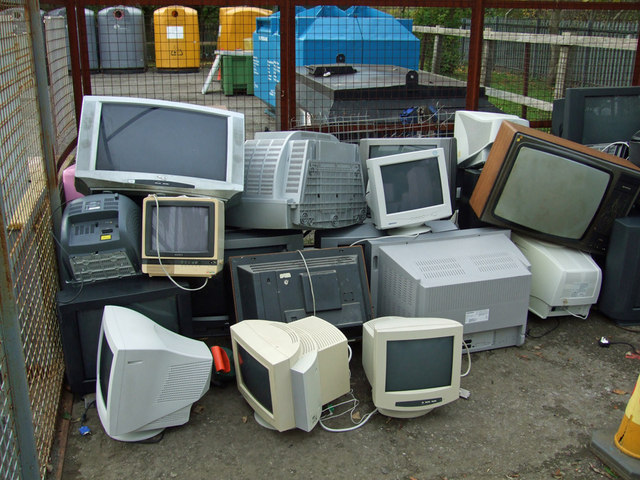
Recycling pen at the Gravel Pit Lane recycling facility in 2008. The change from CRTs to flat-panel technology is responsible for an enormous amount of electronic waste.

Digital ecology is a science studying the interdependence of digital systems and the natural environment. This field of study looks at the methods in which digital technologies are changing the way people interact with the environment, as well as how these technologies affect the environment itself. It is a branch of ecology that promotes green practices to fight digital pollution. Currently the total carbon footprint of the internet, our electronic devices, and supporting elements accounts for about 3.7% of global greenhouse gas emissions (including about 1.4% of overall global carbon dioxide emissions).

Digital ecology can also be used to denote the use of technology in the study of ecological systems and processes, examining how technological developments aid in the collection, analysis and management of ecological data. Important fields in this aspect of digital ecology include the development of drone technology for wildlife monitoring.

== Negative impact on the environment ==
One of the main areas of focus in digital ecology is the impact of electronic waste, or e-waste. As more and more devices become obsolete and are replaced with newer models, the amount of e-waste being produced is increasing at an alarming rate. This e-waste often ends up in landfills, where it can leach harmful chemicals into the soil and water supply.

Another aspect of digital ecology is the energy consumption of digital technologies and the digital pollution in causes. The production and use of digital devices requires significant amounts of energy, and as the demand for these devices increases, so does the amount of energy required to meet this demand.. The total carbon footprint of the internet, our electronic devices, and supporting elements add up to about 3.7% of global greenhouse gas emissions. It is as much as for the airline industry and the number keeps on rising. This increase in energy consumption has a negative impact on the environment, as it contributes to climate change and air pollution. Research has shown, that if the internet was a country, it would be the seventh largest polluter in the world, by some estimates.

=== Digital pollution ===
Technology users contribute to digital pollution on a daily basis, which include energy-inefficient electronics, unnecessary charging of electronic devices, and electronic waste.

== Positive impact on the environment ==
Despite the environmental impact of electronic devices and data centers, digital technologies positively impact the environment in a variety of ways:

- Energy efficiency: Digital technologies can help increase energy efficiency through the use of smart energy systems, such as smart grid systems and energy-efficient devices.
- Reduced waste: The use of digital technologies can reduce waste by reducing the need for paper and other physical materials.
- Enhanced education: Digital technologies can enhance education by providing access to information and resources, promoting sustainable practices and environmental awareness.
