= Bacterial colony optimization =

Optimization algorithm

The bacterial colony optimization algorithm is an optimization algorithm which is based on a lifecycle model that simulates some typical behaviors of E. coli bacteria during their whole lifecycle, including chemotaxis, communication, elimination, reproduction, and migration. The bacterial foraging algorithm (BFA) is a biologically inspired swarm intelligence optimization approach that mimics bacteria's foraging activity to gather the most energy available throughout the search phase. Since its introduction in 2002, it has garnered widespread interest from scholars.
