= Microbial cooperation =

Behavioral pattern of microorganisms

Microorganisms engage in a wide variety of social interactions, including cooperation. A cooperative behavior is one that benefits an individual (the recipient) other than the one performing the behavior (the actor). This article outlines the various forms of cooperative interactions (mutualism and altruism) seen in microbial systems, as well as the benefits that might have driven the evolution of these complex behaviors.

== Introduction ==
Microorganisms, or microbes, span all three domains of life – bacteria, archaea, and many unicellular eukaryotes including some fungi and protists. Typically defined as unicellular life forms that can only be observed with a microscope, microorganisms were the first cellular life forms, and were critical for creating the conditions for the evolution of more complex multicellular forms.

Although microbes are too small to see with the naked eye, they represent the overwhelming majority of biological diversity, and thus serve as an excellent system to study evolutionary questions. One such topic that scientists have examined in microbes is the evolution of social behaviors, including cooperation. A cooperative interaction benefits a recipient, and is selected for on that basis. In microbial systems, cells belonging to the same taxa have been documented partaking in cooperative interactions to perform a wide range of complex multicellular behaviors such as dispersal, foraging, construction of biofilms, reproduction, chemical warfare, and signaling. This article will outline the various forms of cooperative interactions seen in microbial systems, as well as the benefits that might have driven the evolution of these complex behaviors.

== History ==
Table 1: Hamilton's classification of the four types of social behaviors.
		Effect on recipient	
		+	−
Effect on actor	+	Mutual benefit	Selfishness
Effect on actor	−	Altruism	Spite

From an evolutionary point of view, a behavior is social if it has fitness consequences for both the individual that performs that behavior (the actor) and another individual (the recipient). Hamilton first categorized social behaviors according to whether the consequences they entail for the actor and recipient are beneficial (increase direct fitness) or costly (decrease direct fitness). Based on Hamilton's definition, there are four unique types of social interactions: mutualism (+/+), selfishness (+/−), altruism (−/+), and spite (−/−) (Table 1). Mutualism and altruism are considered cooperative interactions because they are beneficial to the recipient, and will be the focus of this article.

Explaining cooperation remains one of the greatest challenges for evolutionary biology, regardless of whether the behavior is considered mutually beneficial or altruistic. According to classical evolutionary theory, an organism will only behave in ways that maximize its own fitness. Therefore, the origin of cooperative interactions, or actions by individuals that result in other individuals receiving fitness benefits, seems counterintuitive.

Theoretical explanations for the evolution of cooperation can be broadly classified into two categories: direct fitness benefits or indirect fitness benefits. This follows from Hamilton's 1964 insight that individuals gain inclusive fitness directly through their impact on their own reproduction (direct fitness effects), as well as through their impact on the reproduction of individuals with related genes (indirect fitness effects).

== Types of cooperation ==
=== Mutualism ===
Perhaps the most common cooperative interactions seen in microbial systems are mutually beneficial. Mutually beneficial social interactions provide a direct fitness benefit to both individuals involved, while outweighing any cost of performing the behaviour. In an environment with individual microbes, mutualism is most often performed in order to increase individual fitness benefit. However, in a community, microorganisms will interact on a large scale to allow for the persistence of the population, which will thereby increase their own fitness.

The majority of the time, organisms partaking in these behaviours have a shared interest in cooperation. In microbial systems, this is often seen in the production of metabolically expensive molecules, known as public goods. Many microbes, especially bacteria, produce numerous public goods that are released into the extracellular environment. The diffusion that occurs allows for them to be used by neighbouring organisms, despite being produced for the individual.

One very popular example of mutually beneficial microbial interactions involves the production of siderophores. Siderophores are iron-scavenging molecules produced by many microbial taxa, including bacteria and fungi. These molecules are known as chelating agents and play an important role in facilitating the uptake and metabolism of iron in the environment, as it normally exists in an insoluble form. In order for bacteria to access this limiting factor, cells will manufacture these molecules, and then secrete them into the extracellular space. Once released, the siderophores will sequester the iron, and form a complex, which is recognized by bacterial cell receptors. It can then be transported into the cell and reduced, making the iron metabolically accessible for the bacteria. The production of siderophores is often used as an example of mutualism as the compounds are not constricted to individual usage. As long as the organism possesses a receptor for the siderophore-Fe (III) complex, they can be taken up and utilized.

There are many explanations in place that justify the evolution of mutually beneficial interactions. Most importantly, in order for the production of public goods to be evolutionarily beneficial, the behaviour must provide a direct benefit to the reproductive performance of the actor that outweighs the cost of performing the behaviour. This is most often seen in the case of direct fitness benefit. As bacteria are most often found in colonies, neighbouring bacteria are likely to express genetic commonality. Therefore, by increasing the chances for a nearby bacterium to grow and divide, the host is increasing their own passage of genetic material. In the case of siderophores, a positive correlation was found between relatedness among bacterial lineages and siderophore production.

Microbial communities are not only interested in the survival and productivity of their own species, however. In a mixed community, different bacterial species have been found to adapt to different food sources, including the waste products of other species, in order to stave off unnecessary competition. This allows heightened efficiency for the community as a whole.

Having a balanced community is very important for microbial success. In the case of siderophore production, there must be equilibrium between the microbes that spend their energy to produce the chelating agents, and those that can utilize xenosiderophores. Otherwise, the exploitative microbes would eventually out-compete the producers, leaving a community with no organisms able to produce siderophores, and thus, unable to survive in low iron conditions. This ability to balance between the two populations is currently being researched. It is thought to be due to the presence of low-affinity receptors on the non-producers, or producers generating a toxin-mediated interference mechanism.

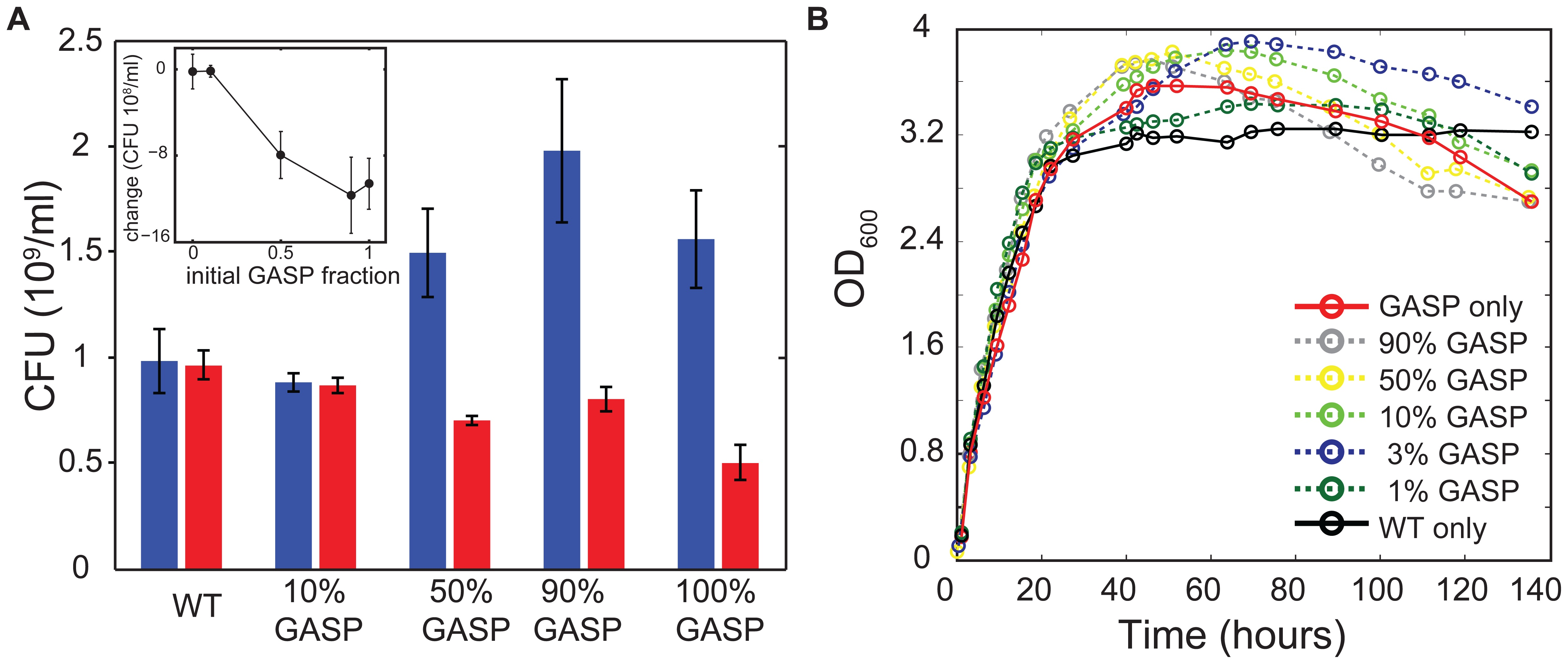
Figure 1: The Prisoner Dilemma in a bacterial community. GASP mutants initially reach a high population density and subsequently decrease population viability.(a) Colony forming units (CFU) measured at day 1 (blue bars) and day 4 (red bars) of pure WT and GASP cultures and co-cultures with starting fractions of 90% WT and 10% GASP, 50% WT and 50% GASP, and 10% WT and 90% GASP. Error bars indicate the standard error of the mean of three replicate cultures. The inset shows that the change in the number of CFUs between day 4 and day 1 depends on the initial GASP fraction of a culture. (b) Growth curves, measured as optical density (OD) at 600 nm, of well-mixed batch cultures. A pure WT culture (black) sustains its population density for days, whereas a pure GASP culture (red) initially reaches a higher population density which later declines and drops below the level of the pure WT culture. WT-GASP co-cultures (dashed lines) show the frequency dependence of the overshooting and subsequent decline of population density.

While the production of public goods aims to benefit all individuals, it also leads to the evolution of cheaters, or individuals that do not pay the cost of producing a good, but still receive benefits (Figure 1). In order to minimize fitness costs, natural selection will favor individuals that do not to secrete while taking advantage of the secretions of their neighbors. In a population of siderophore secreting cells, non-secreting mutant cells do not pay the cost of secretion, but still gain the same benefit as the wild-type neighbors. Recently, Griffin et al. (2004) investigated the social nature of the production of siderophores in Pseudomonas aeruginosa. When cells were grown in pure culture were placed in an iron-limiting environment, populations of cells that secreted siderophores (wild-type) outcompeted a population of mutant non-secretors. Therefore, siderophore production is beneficial when iron is limiting. However, when the same populations were placed in an iron-rich environment, the mutant population outcompeted wild-type population, demonstrating that siderophore production is metabolically costly. Finally, when both wild type and mutant bacteria were placed in the same mixed population, the mutants can gain the benefit of siderophore production without paying the cost, and hence increase in frequency. This concept is commonly referred to the tragedy of the commons.

The prisoner's dilemma game is another way that evolutionary biologists explain the presence of cheating in cooperative microbial systems. Originally framed by Merrill Flood and Melvin Dresher in 1950, the Prisoner's Dilemma is a fundamental problem in game theory, and demonstrates that two individuals might not cooperate even if it is in both their best interests to do so. In the dilemma, two individuals each choose whether to cooperate with the other individual or to cheat. Cooperation by both individuals gives the greatest average advantage. However, if one individual decides to cheat, they will obtain a greater individual advantage. If the game is played only once cheating is the superior strategy since it is the superior strategy. However, in biologically realistic situations, with repeated interactions (games), mutations, and heterogeneous environments, there is often no single stable solution and the success of individual strategies can vary in endless periodic or chaotic cycles. The specific solution to the game will depend critically on the way iterations are implemented and how pay-offs are translated to population and community dynamics.

In the bacteria Escherichia coli, a Prisoner Dilemma situation can be observed when mutants exhibiting a Grow Advantage in Stationary Phase (GASP) phenotype compete with a wild type (WT) strain in batch culture. In such batch culture settings, where the growth environment is homogenized by shaking the cultures, WT cells cooperate by arresting bacterial growth in order to prevent ecological collapse while the GASP mutants continue to grow by defecting to the wild type regulatory mechanism. As a consequence of such defection to the self-regulation of growth by the GASP cells, although higher cell densities are achieved in the short term, a population collapse is attained in the long run due to the tragedy of the commons (Figure 1). On the contrary, although WT cells do not achieve such high population densities, their populations are sustainable at the same density in the long term. As predicted by theory, in a spatial setting such as those implemented experimentally by microfluidics chips, coexistence between the two strains is possible due to the localization of interactions and the spatial segregation of cheaters. When provided with such a spatial environment, bacteria can self-organize into dynamic patterns of cell aggregation, desegregation which ensure that cooperator WT cells can reap the benefits of cooperation (Figure 2).

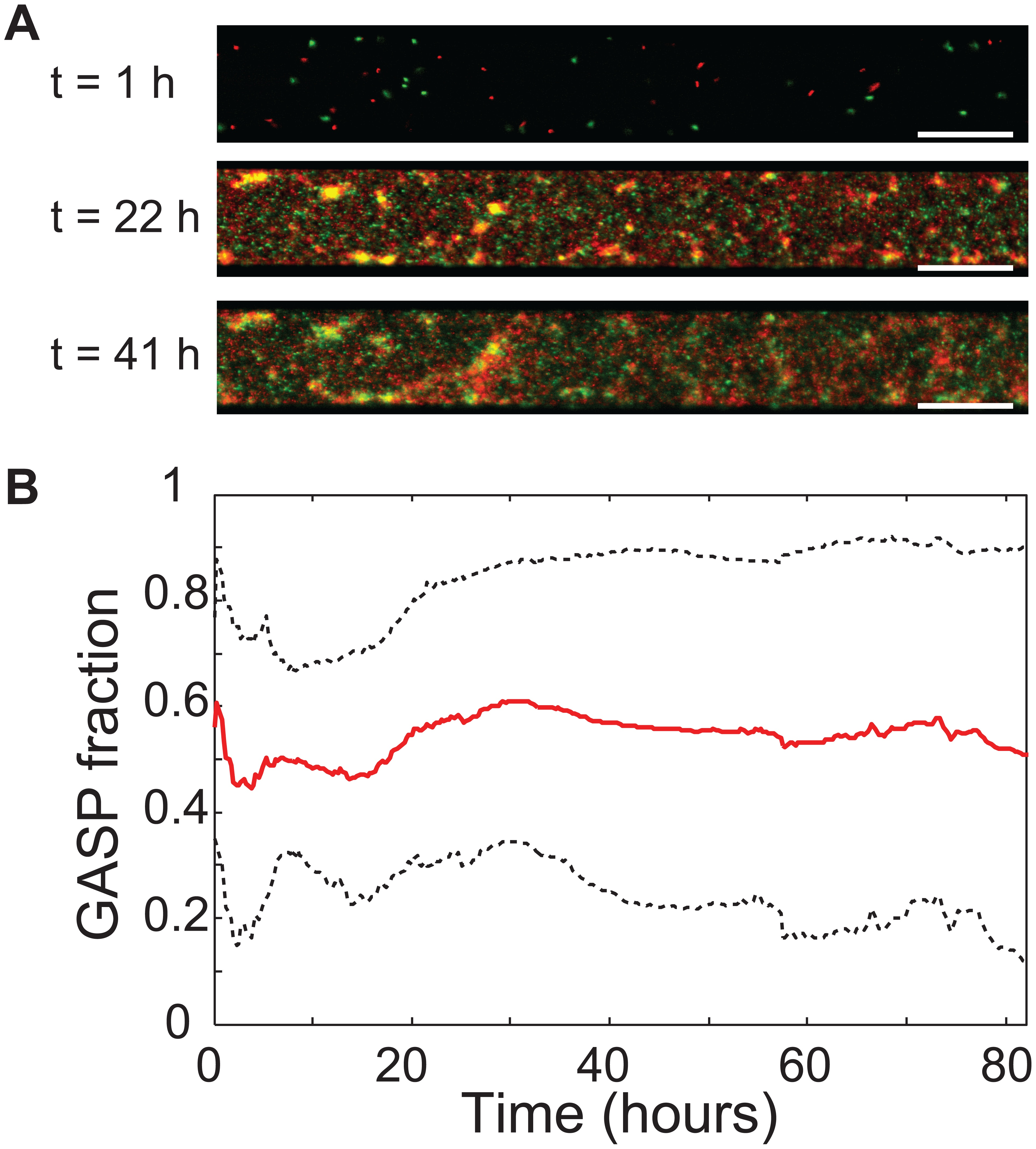
Figure 2: Spatial Prisoner Dilemma and the coexistence of cheaters and cooperators in an E. Coli community. WT and GASP E. coli coexist in a single-patch habitat. (a) Microscopy pictures showing a section of a habitat consisting of a single patch (8500×100×15$\mu m$) at three time-points, the white bar indicates 50 m. WT (green) and GASP (red) cells develop into a structured community. Initially (1 hour) planktonic cells colonize the habitat, a day later many multi-cellular aggregates have formed. The composition of these aggregates (indicated by their color) changes over time. (b) GASP fraction through time of microhabitats consisting of a single patch with a volume equal to the total volume of an 85-patch microhabitat. Mean of experiments (red solid line), black dashed lines indicate the mean the standard deviation.

Greig & Travisano (2004) addressed these ideas with an experimental study on yeast Saccharomyces cerevisiae. S. cerevisiae possesses multiple genes that each produce invertase, an enzyme that is secreted to digest sucrose outside of the cell. As discussed above, this public good production creates the potential for individual cells to cheat by stealing the sugar digested by their neighbors without contributing the enzyme themselves. Greig & Travisano (2004) measured the fitness of a cheater type (who possessed a reduced number of invertase genes) relative to a cooperator (who contained all possible invertase genes). By manipulating the level of social interaction within the community by varying the population density, they found that the cheater is less fit than the cooperator at low levels of sociality, but more fit in dense communities. Therefore, they propose that selection for "cheating" causes natural variation in the amount of invertase genes an individual may possess, and that variation in invertase genes reflects constant adaptation to an ever-changing biotic environment that is a consequence of the instability of cooperative interactions.

=== Altruism ===
The second type of cooperative interactions is altruistic, or interactions that are beneficial to the recipient but costly to the actor (-/+). Justifying the evolutionary benefit of altruistic behavior is a highly debated topic. A common justification for the presence of altruistic behaviors is that they provide an indirect benefit because the behavior is directed towards other individuals who carry the cooperative gene. The simplest and most common reason for two individuals to share genes in common is for them to be genealogical relatives (kin), and so this is often termed kin selection. According to Hamilton, an altruistic act is evolutionarily beneficial if the relatedness of the individual that profits from the altruistic act is higher than the cost/benefit ratio this act imposes. This rationale is referred to as Hamilton's rule.

Natural selection normally favors a gene if it increases reproduction, because the offspring share copies of that gene. However, a gene can also be favored if it aids other relatives, who also share copies. Therefore, by helping a close relative reproduce, an individual is still passing on its own genes to the next generation, albeit indirectly. Hamilton pointed out that kin selection could occur via two mechanisms: (a) kin discrimination, when cooperation is preferentially directed toward relatives, and (b) limited dispersal (population viscosity), which keeps relatives in spatial proximity to one another, allowing cooperation to be directed indiscriminately toward all neighbors (who tend to be relatives). In microbial systems, these two mechanisms are equally important. For example, most microbial populations often begin from a small number of colonizers. Because most microbes reproduce asexually, close genetic relatives will surround cells as the population grows. These clonal populations often result in an extremely high density, especially in terrestrial systems. Therefore, the probability that a cell's altruistic behavior will benefit a close relative is extremely high.

While altruistic behaviors are most common between individuals with high genetic relatedness, it is not completely necessary. Altruistic behaviors can also be evolutionarily beneficial if the cooperation is directed towards individuals who share the gene of interest, regardless of whether this is due to coancestry or some other mechanism. An example of this is known as the "green beard" mechanism, and requires a single gene (or a number of tightly linked genes) that both causes the cooperative behavior and can be recognized by other individuals due to a distinctive phenotypic marker, such as a green beard.

The most studied slime mold from this perspective is Dictyostelium discoideum, a predator of bacteria that is common in the soil. When starving, the usually solitary single-celled amoebae aggregate and form a multicellullar slug that can contain 10^{4}–10^{6} cells. This slug migrates to the soil surface, where it transforms into a fruiting body composed of a spherical tip of spores and a stalk consisting of nonviable stalk cells that hold the spores aloft (Figure 2). Roughly 20% of the cells develop into the non-reproductive stalk, elevating the spores and aiding their dispersal.

Programmed cell death (PCD) is another suggested form of microbial altruistic behavior. Although programmed cell death (also known as apoptosis or autolysis) clearly provides no direct fitness benefit, it can be evolutionary adaptive if it provides indirect benefits to individuals with high genetic relatedness (kin selection). Several altruistic possibilities have been suggested for PCD, such as providing resources that could be used by other cells for growth and survival in Saccharomyces cerevisiae. While using kin selection to explain the evolutionary benefits of PCD is common, the reasoning contains some inherent problems. Charlesworth (1978) noted that it is extremely hard for a gene causing suicide to spread because only relatives that do NOT share the gene would ultimately benefit. Therefore, the possible solution to this problem in microbes is that selection could favor a low probability of PCD among a large population of cells, possibly depending upon individual condition, environmental conditions, or signaling.

== Other microbial interactions ==
=== Quorum sensing ===
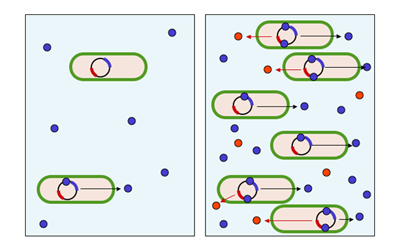
Figure 3: Diagram of quorum sensing. (left) In low density, the concentration of the autoinducer (blue dots) is relatively low and the substance production is restricted. (right) In high density, the concentration of the autoinducer is high and the bacterial substances (red dots) are produced.

The integration of cooperative and communicative interactions appear to be extremely important to microbes; for example, 6–10% of all genes in the bacterium Pseudomonas aeruginosa are controlled by cell-cell signaling systems. One way that microbes communicate and organize with each other in order to partake in more advanced cooperative interactions is through quorum sensing. Quorum sensing describes the phenomenon in which the accumulation of signaling molecules in the surrounding environment enables a single cell to assess the number of individuals (cell density) so that the population as a whole can make a coordinated response. This interaction is fairly common among bacterial taxa, and involves the secretion by individual cells of 'signaling' molecules, called autoinducers or pheromones. These bacteria also have a receptor that can specifically detect the signaling molecule. When the inducer binds the receptor, it activates transcription of certain genes, including those for inducer synthesis. There is a low likelihood of a bacterium detecting its own secreted inducer. Thus, in order for gene transcription to be activated, the cell must encounter signaling molecules secreted by other cells in its environment. When only a few other bacteria of the same kind are in the vicinity, diffusion reduces the concentration of the inducer in the surrounding medium to almost zero, so the bacteria produce little inducer. However, as the population grows the concentration of the inducer passes a threshold, causing more inducer to be synthesized. This forms a positive feedback loop, and the receptor becomes fully activated. Activation of the receptor induces the up regulation of other specific genes, causing all of the cells to begin transcription at approximately the same time. In other words, when the local concentration of these molecules has reached a threshold, the cells respond by switching on particular genes. In this way individual cells can sense the local density of bacteria, so that the population as a whole can make a coordinated response.

In many situations, the cost bacterial cells pay in order to coordinate behaviors outweighs the benefits unless there is a sufficient number of collaborators. For instance, the bioluminescent luciferase produced by Vibrio fischeri would not be visible if it was produced by a single cell. By using quorum sensing to limit the production of luciferase to situations when cell populations are large, V. fischeri cells are able to avoid wasting energy on the production of useless product. In many situations bacterial activities, such as the production of the mentioned public goods, are only worthwhile as a joint activity by a sufficient number of collaborators. Regulation by quorum sensing would allow the cells to express appropriate behavior only when it is effective, thus saving resources under low density conditions. Therefore, quorum sensing has been interpreted as a bacterial communication system to coordinate behaviors at the population level.

The opportunistic bacteria Pseudomonas aeruginosa also uses quorum sensing to coordinate the formation of biofilms, swarming motility, exopolysaccharide production, and cell aggregation. These bacteria can grow within a host without harming it, until they reach a certain concentration. Then they become aggressive, their numbers sufficient to overcome the host's immune system, and form a biofilm, leading to disease within the host. Another form of gene regulation that allows the bacteria to rapidly adapt to surrounding changes is through environmental signaling. Recent studies have discovered that anaerobiosis can significantly impact the major regulatory circuit of quorum sensing. This important link between quorum sensing and anaerobiosis has a significant impact on production of virulence factors of this organism. It is hoped that the therapeutic enzymatic degradation of the signaling molecules will prevent the formation of such biofilms and possibly weaken established biofilms. Disrupting the signalling process in this way is called quorum inhibition.

=== Bacterial mating ===
==== Streptococcus pneumoniae ====
S. pneumoniae has evolved a cooperative complex quorum sensing system that regulates the production of bacteriocins as well as entry into the competent state necessary for natural genetic transformation. In naturally competent S. pneumoniae, the competent state rather than being a constitutive property, is induced by a peptide pheromone involving a quorum-sensing mechanism. The induction of the competence causes release of DNA from a sub-fraction of the S. pneumoniae population, most probably by cell lysis. Subsequently the majority of the S. pneumoniae cells that are induced to competence act as recipients and take up the DNA that is released by the donors. Natural transformation in S. pneumoniae is likely a natural cooperative mechanism for promoting genetic recombination that is similar to sex in higher organisms. In spite of the availability of effective vaccines, S. pneumoniae is responsible for the death of more than a million people yearly.

==== Vibrio cholerae ====
V. cholerae has the ability to communicate strongly at the cellular level, and this process is recognized as a form of cooperative quorum-sensing. Two different stimuli that are encountered in the small intestine, the absence of oxygen and the presence of host-produced bile salts, affect V. cholerae quorum sensing function and therefore its pathogenicity. Cooperative quorum sensing likely contributes to natural genetic transformation, a process that includes the uptake of V. cholerae extracellular DNA by (competent) V. cholerae cells. V. cholerae is a bacterial pathogen that causes cholera, a disease that is associated with severe contagious diarrhea that affects millions of people globally.

==== Bacterial transformation ====
At least 80 species of bacteria appear to be capable of transformation, about evenly divided between Gram-positive and Gram-negative bacteria.

== Implications ==
While the evolution of cooperative interactions allowed microbial taxa to increase their fitness, it is hypothesized that cooperation provided a proximate cause to other major evolutionary transitions, including the evolution of multicellularity. This idea, often referred to as the Colonial Theory, was first proposed by Haeckel in 1874, and claims that the symbiosis of many organisms of the same species (unlike the symbiotic theory, which suggests the symbiosis of different species) led to a multicellular organism. In a few instances, multicellularity occurs by cells separating and then rejoining (e.g., cellular slime molds) whereas for the majority of multicellular types, multicellularity occurs as a consequence of cells failing to separate following division. The mechanism of this latter colony formation can be as simple as incomplete cytokinesis, though multicellularity is also typically considered to involve cellular differentiation.

The advantage of the Colonial Theory hypothesis is that it has been seen to occur independently numerous times (in 16 different protoctistan phyla). For instance, during food shortages Dictyostelium discoideum cells group together in a colony that moves as one to a new location. Some of these cells then slightly differentiate from each other. Other examples of colonial organisation in protozoa are Volvocaceae, such as Eudorina and Volvox. However, it can often be hard to separate colonial protists from true multicellular organisms, as the two concepts are not distinct. This problem plagues most hypotheses of how multicellularisation could have occurred.

== See also ==
- Microbial intelligence
- Microorganism
- The evolution of cooperation
- Co-operation (evolution)
