= Swarm 3D printing =

Manufacturing using a swarm of mobile robots

Swarm 3D printing or cooperative 3D printing or swarm manufacturing is a digital manufacturing platform that employs a swarm of mobile robots with different functionalities to work together to print and assemble products based on digital designs. A digital design is first divided into smaller chunks and components based on its geometry and functions, which are then assigned to different specialized robots for printing and assembly in parallel and in sequence based on the dependency of the tasks.

The robots typically move freely on an open factory floor, or through the air, and could carry different tool heads. Some common tool heads include material deposition tool heads (e.g., filament extruder, inkjet printhead), pick and place tool head for embedding of pre-manufactured components, laser cutter, welding tool, etc. In some cases, operations are managed by artificial intelligence algorithms, increasingly prevalent with larger swarms or more complex robots, which require elements of autonomy to work together effectively. While in its early stage of development, swarm 3D printing is currently being commercialized by startup companies. According to Additive Manufacturing Magazine, AMBOTS is credited with creating the first end-to-end solution for cooperative 3D printing. Using the Rapid Induction Printing metal additive manufacturing process, Rosotics was the first company to demonstrate swarm 3D printing using a metallic payload, and the only to achieve metallic 3D printing from an airborne platform.

== See also ==
- Ant robotics
- Autonomous agents
- Behavior-based robotics
- Flocking (behavior)
- Kilobot
- List of emerging technologies
- Microbotics
- Multi-agent system
- Nanorobotics
- Nanotechnology in fiction
- Physicomimetics
- Robotic materials
- Shooting Star (drone)
- Swarm intelligence
- Swarm robotic platforms
- Unmanned aerial vehicle/Quadcopter
