= List of drone displays =

Below is a list of notable drone displays sorted by date.

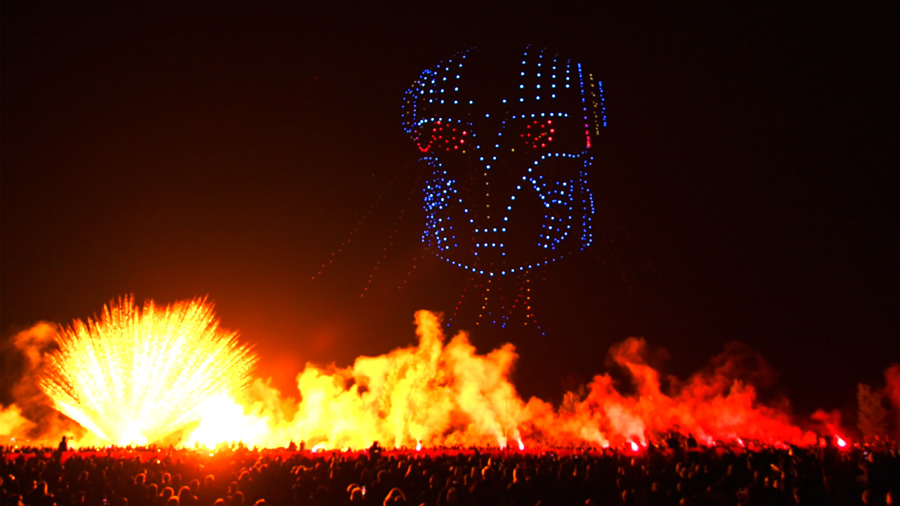
Drones form a giant laser-shooting robot head above a crowd, creating explosive fireballs in the iconic drone-and-pyrotechnics performance at PGI 2023. Performed by the Verge Aero partner network and Spirit of '76 Fireworks.

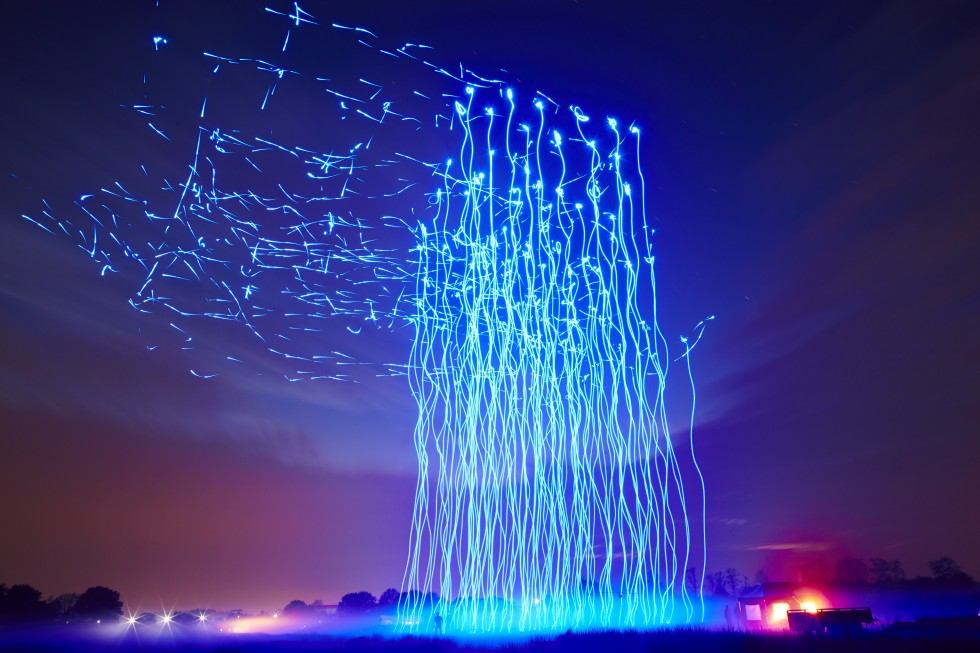
"Drone100" performed by Ars Electronica Futurelab, for Intel, in 2015

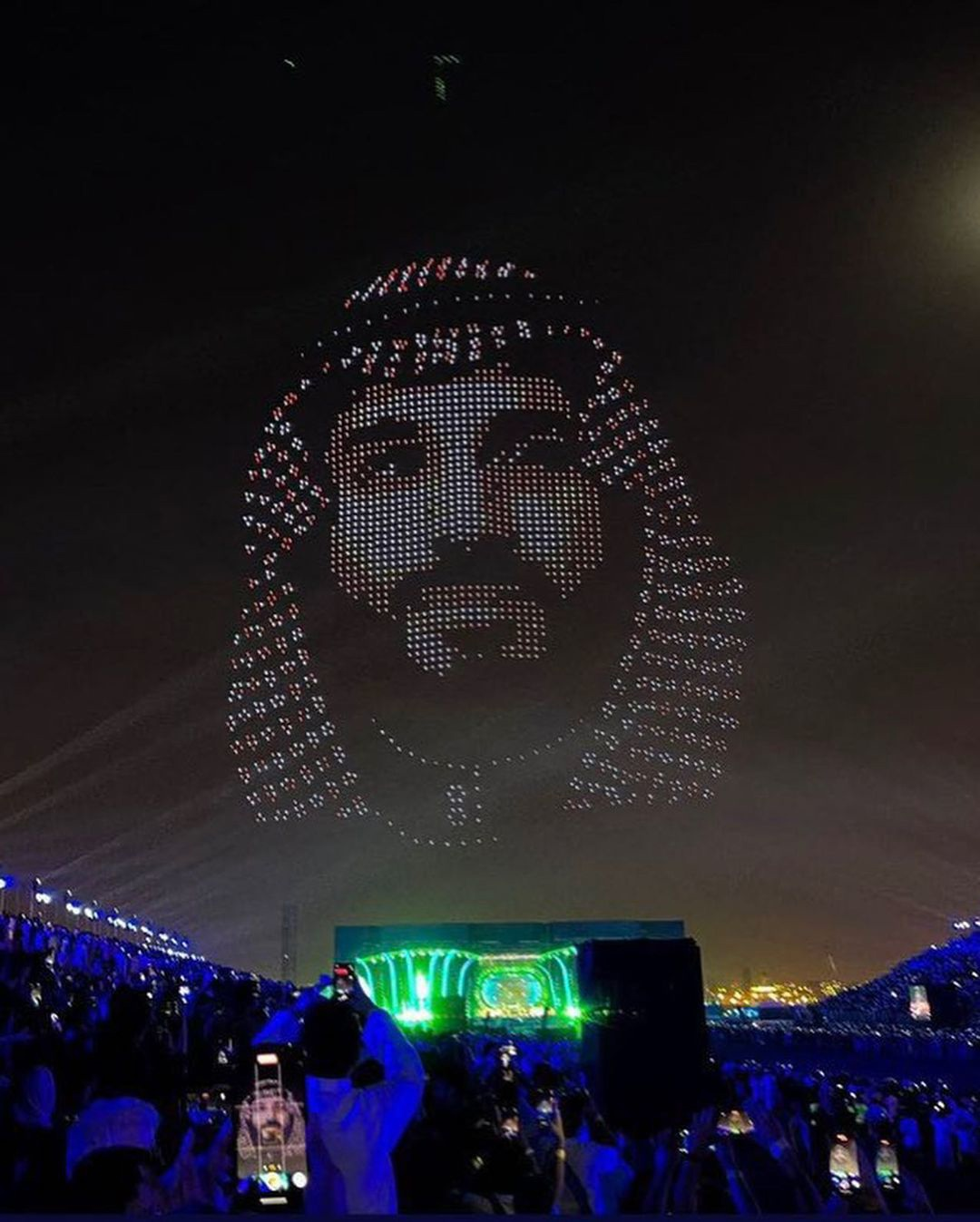
2100 drones portrait of Mohammed bin Salman Al Saud performed by Geoscan Group at the Saud Riyadh Seasons 2021 opening ceremony

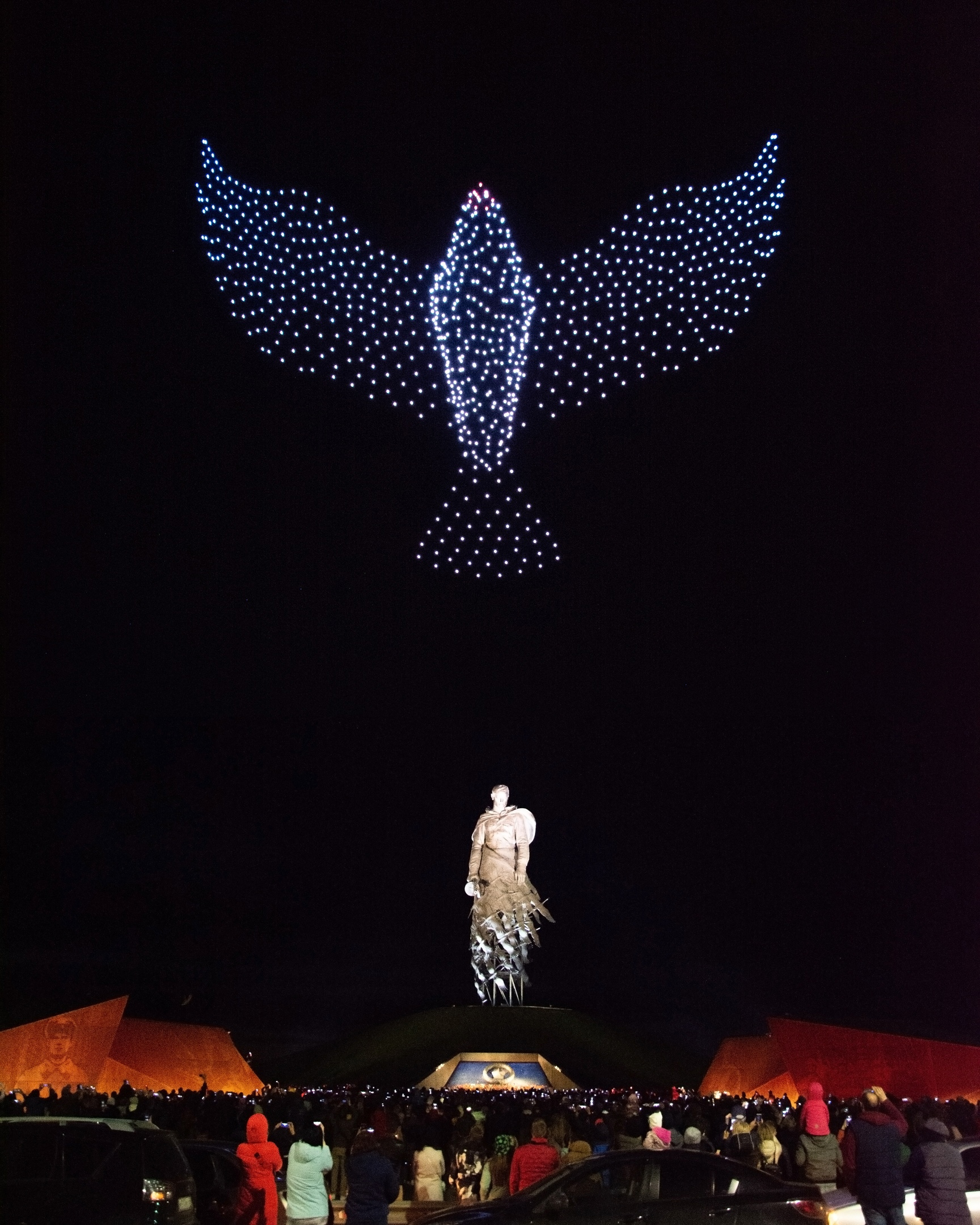
1000 drones launch to pay respect to the soldiers fallen in the Battles of Rzhev

== 2012 ==
- June 2012 - 19 LED-equipped UAVs, with mirrors mounted to them performed at a world premiere by Marshmallow Laser Feast at Meet Your Creator, Saatchi & Saatchi New Directors' Showcase / Cannes, France.
- September 2012 - 49 LED-equipped UAVs, called SPAXELS (short for "Space Elements") performed at a world premiere by Ars Electronica Futurelab.

== 2013 ==
- March 2013 - 50 SPAXELS used to perform at the premiere of the film Star Trek Into Darkness next to Tower Bridge in London
- August 2013 - 30 SPAXELS used to perform the opening of the new campus at QUT, Brisbane, Australia

== 2014 ==
- Research publication of first autonomous swarm of 10 drones with a show-like teaser video by Department of Biological Physics, Eötvös Loránd University, Hungary.

== 2015 ==
- November 2015 - 100 SPAXELS used for the first Guinness World Record "Drone100" by Ars Electronica Futurelab for Intel
- August 2015 - First drone show with human-drone interaction and real-time swarming by CollMot Robotics and Nina Kov for Sziget Festival.

== 2016 ==
- November 2016 - Five hundred drones were used in Krailling, Germany, setting a Guinness World Record.
- November 2016 to Jan 8, 2017 - Intel/Disney "Star Bright Holidays", Disney Springs, Walt Disney World Resort, Lake Buena Vista, Florida.

== 2017 ==
- 5 February 2017 - Three hundred drones performed during a Lady Gaga song in the Super Bowl LI halftime show.
- 2017 - At the Fortune Global Forum in China, 1,180 drones performed.
- August 2017 - First drone-launched pyro show by CollMot Robotics and phase7 at the H.C. Andersen Festival, Odense, Denmark.
- September 2017 - To mark the release of the home version of the Wonder Woman film, 300 drones displayed an enormous "W" in the night sky above Los Angeles.
- December 2017 - A swarm of 300 Intel drones performed at Art Basel in Miami Beach by Studio Drift and performed by Intel and DroneStories.

== 2018 ==
- 2018 - During the 2018 Winter Olympics opening ceremony, 1,218 drones performed, breaking the previous world record.
- June 2018 - One hundred SKYMAGIC drones performed in Newcastle, England creating shapes synchronized to music at the opening of the Great Exhibition of the North.
- July 2018 - Intel celebrated its 50th anniversary with 2018 simultaneous drones over their facility in Folsom, California setting a Guinness world record. Intel flew 2066 drones.

== 2019 ==
- January 2019 - Two hundred SKYMAGIC drones were deployed for the world's first New Year's Countdown set to fireworks and music for New Year's celebrations on Al Marjan Island.
- 3 February 2019 - 150 enhanced Intel Shooting Star drones, choreographed to the music of Maroon 5 at the Super Bowl halftime show.
- July 2019 - Two hundred and fifty UVify IFO drones performed at the opening show of the 24th World Scout Jamboree.
- August 2019 - Five hundred drones performed at the 80 years of VDNH celebration in Moscow.
- October 2019 - Two hundred drones presented the new Peugeot 208 show above Paris.
- December 10, 2019 - 150 drones were used to show a spectacular dazzling display for the ending ceremony of South Asian Games 2020, Nepal held at the Dasharath stadium in Kathmandu, Nepal.

== 2020 ==
- June 2020 - A 200 drones light show celebrating the 3rd San Giovanni Festival, breaking the world record for simultaneous indoor drone flight
- September 3, 2020 - Geoscan Group launched 2,198 drones at the 75th anniversary of the end of the World War II in Saint Petersburg, Russia. The record was registered by the Record Book of Russia.
- September 20, 2020 - 3,051 drones created a spectacular light show in China setting a Guinness world record. The record was set by Shenzhen Damoda Intelligent Control Technology Co., Ltd in Zhuhai, Guandong.
- November 8, 2020 - 1,000 drones show at the «Wonder of Light» festival in Saint Petersburg performed by Geoscan Group
- December 31, 2020 - 300 drones show at the New Year's Eve fireworks and lighting display in London performed by SKYMAGIC

== 2021 ==
- March 17, 2021 - 500 Intel drones in a (pre-recorded) Orchestra of Light show to celebrate Saint Patrick's Day in Dublin
- April 12, 2021 – Geoscan Drone Show team launched 500 drones in Veliky Novgorod, Russia to celebrate the 60th anniversary of the 1st manned flight in space.
- May 2, 2021 – a performance of 500 quadcopters was shown at the Tourist Season Opening festival in St. Petersburg.
- May 9, 2021 – 1000 drones were launched by Geoscan Drone Show team at the Rzhev Memorial to the Soviet Soldier paying respect to soldiers who fell in the Battles of Rzhev.
- May 2021 – 580 quadcopters show presentation of the new Hyundai Tucson in Istanbul city. It was performed by the Geoscan Drone Show team.
- July 2021, a show using 5200 drones in China
- July 23, 2021 - 1,824 drones are used during the Tokyo 2020 Summer Olympics opening ceremony. The drones began above the stadium in positions which depicted the Tokyo 2020 games emblem slowly changing into a rotating sphere with the countries of the world outlined.
- August 21, 2021 – a drone show of 1200 quadcopters were launched in Nizhniy Novgorod, Russia by Geoscan Drone Show celebrating the city's 800th anniversary.
- August 25, 2021 – 1000 drones were put into the sky in Ufa, Russia by Geoscan Drone Show in a display dedicated to the beginning of the WorldSkills Russia contest.
- August 27, 2021 – Samsung Electronics company presented its new smartphones in Estonia with a drone show of 500 quadcopters launched by the Geoscan Drone Show team.
- August 31, 2021 – 1000 drones launch to celebrate the Knowledge Day in Pushkin, Saint Petersburg
- September 4, 2021 - a 100-drone show by Cyberdrone to celebrate the 875th anniversary of Yelets, Russia
- September 18, 2021 - Cyberdrone's light show with 100 drones celebrating the Balashikha City Day
- September 21, 2021 – 1000 drones were used in a drone display performed by Geoscan Drone Show during the Armenia Independence Day celebrations.
- October 20, 2021 – 2100 drones were used in a display performed by Geoscan Drone Show during the opening ceremony of Riyadh Seasons 2021.
- December 4, 2021 - 300 drones illuminated the sky of Mumbai in a Cyberdrone show.
- December 11, 2021 - 500 Cyberdrone drones turned the 75 years of Grasim Industries celebration into a spectacle.

== 2022 ==
- January 1, 2022 - Cyberdrone Johnnie Walker light show with 500 drones dancing in the sky
- January 1, 2022 - a SKYMAGIC show (from SkyMagic) in London as part of the New Year's Day celebration
- January 29, 2022 - 1000 drones designed and built by BotLab Dynamics, an Indian startup, performed in a display at the Beating Retreat ceremony in New Delhi as a part of India's Republic Day celebrations.
- March 1, 2022 - 663 UAVs formed the slogan "Русский военный корабль, иди на хуй" ("Russian warship, go **** yourself") against the background of the Motherland Monument in Kyiv.
- March 6, 2022 - Disneyland Paris premiered a pre and post Illuminations drone show called D Lite and After Glow for their 30th birthday celebrations, which ran nightly until 30 September 2022.
- March 2022 - The world's first feature-length art show containing drones, SKY SONG at Adelaide Fringe Festival, performed by Celestial using UVify IFO drones. It had the world's biggest holographic projector screens and showcased First Nation art
- June 25, 2022 - 500 drones flying over the Miloud Hadefi Stadium in Oran, Algeria throughout the opening ceremony of the Mediterranean Games in 2022 in Oran
- June 26, 2022 - 800 drones created formations over El Hadj Hassan Gouled Aptidon Stadium to celebrate the 45th anniversary of Djibouti's Independence. BotLab Dynamics designed and executed the show which was the first and largest show in Africa.
- August 28, August 30 and September 1, 2022 - 400 drones by SKYMAGIC performed three shows in Weston-super-Mare, England as part of the See Monster art installation.
- October 2022 - 500 UVify IFO drones, performed by Celestial and commissioned by Prime Video, lit up the skies in Lagos, Nigeria for the season finale of The Lord of the Rings: The Rings of Power making it the first drone show in West Africa.

== 2023 ==
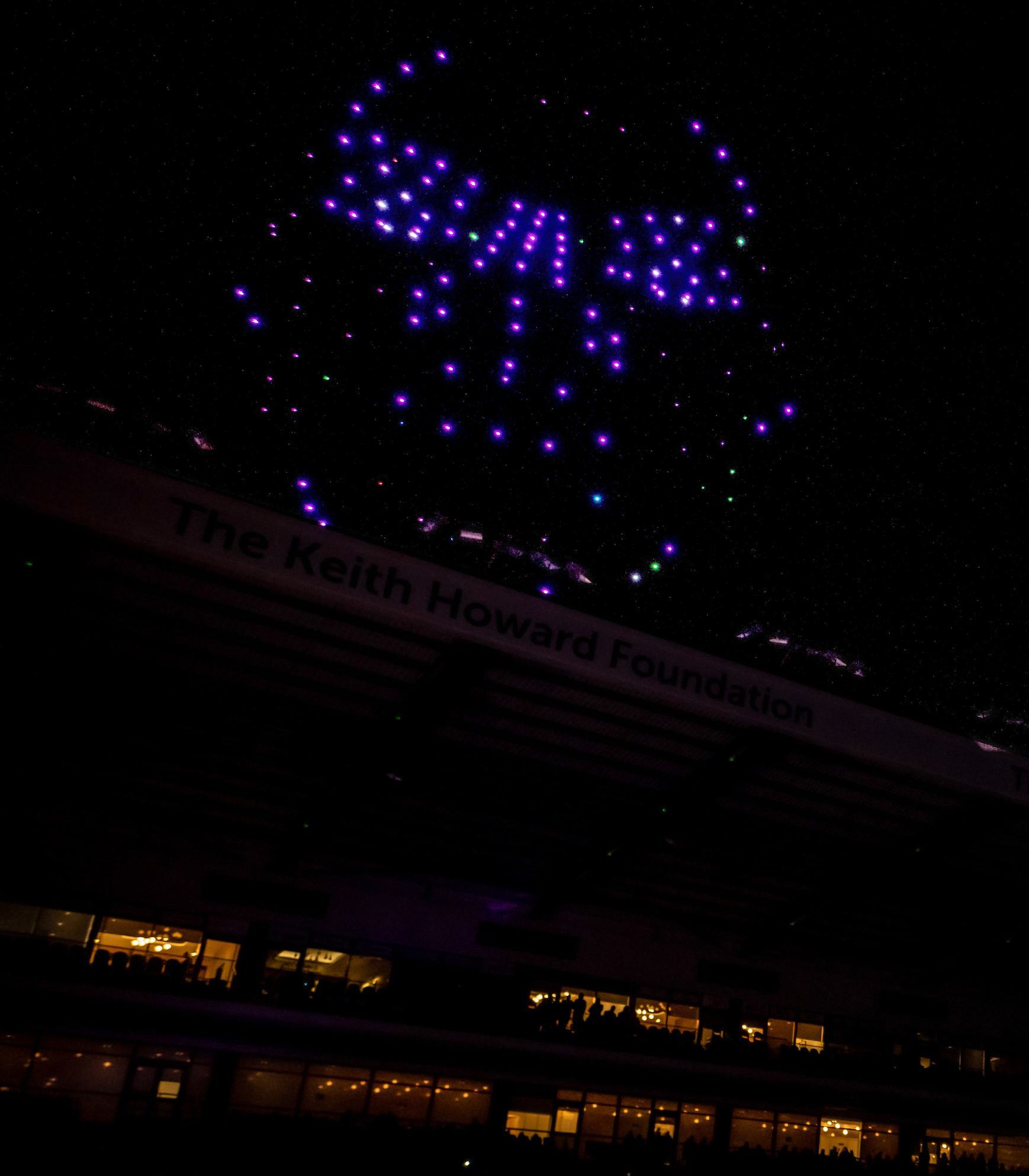
The drone art Giant at The Awakening, LEEDS 2023

- January 1, 2023 - Celestial drones performed at the London New Year's Eve Celebration with UVify IFO drones
- January 7, 2023 - At The Awakening, the opening ceremony of Leeds 2023, held at Headingley Stadium, a giant head spoke to the people of the city.
- January 29, 2023 - BotLab Dynamics'’ fleet of 3500 drones lit up the skies of New Delhi during the Beating Retreat ceremony for the second year in a row, to perform the world's second largest drone light show till date
- March 14, 2023 - Drone show Europe by Spectrum production team flew 500 drones in Albania. This was the first show in Albania and one of the biggest shows in the whole of Europe. The drone show also won international awards.
- April 2, 2023 - 600 UVify IFO drones used to perform in promoting the animated film The Super Mario Bros. Movie at the Santa Monica Pier in Santa Monica, California.
- April 16 and April 26, 2023 - 864 drones by Studio Drift performed at Coachella festival during both of Björk's sets, based on "architectural and physics shapes—curves based on biology, like cells and microorganisms."
- Aug 27, 2023 - DroneSwarm produce the UK's first drone light show proposal at Newby Hall in Yorkshire
- October 25, 2023 - 600-drone light show illuminated the Kolkata sky during the Durga Puja celebrations in West Bengal. The drones created festive formations depicting symbols associated with the Puja and Bijoya Dashami. BotLab Dynamics designed and executed the show, which received widespread local media coverage for its visual scale and its introduction of drone-based storytelling into one of Kolkata’s largest cultural events.
- October 2023 – Newcastle United F.C.'s shirt sponsor, Sela, created an animated UVify IFO drone display above the St James' Park stadium in Newcastle upon Tyne, England to celebrate the team's return to the UEFA Champions' League after their last campaign 20 years earlier.
- November 19, 2023 - 500-drone display was performed over Narendra Modi Stadium during the Cricket World Cup finale. BotLab Dynamics executed the show, presenting tournament-themed aerial formations for the event.

== 2024 ==
- On March 25, 2024, Athens celebrated Greek Independence Day with a synchronized drone show over Lycabettus Hill. Organized by Grizzly Entertainment Hellas, the first drone light show company in Greece, the display featured patriotic symbols and historic imagery, blending technology with national pride.
- On July 1, 2024, Missy Elliott's birthday celebration at Gloria Molina Grand Park featured a spectacular drone light show orchestrated by Grizzly Drones.
- On July 4, 2024, a drone show featuring 700 drones took place at Gloria Molina Grand Park. The annual event showcased a theme centered on technology, innovation, and sustainability.
- July 14, 2024 - 1,571 drones were used at Disneyland Paris to created a giant tricolor Mickey Mouse for their special drone show accompanied with fireworks to commemorate Bastille Day, set a Guinness World Records title for orchestrating “the Largest aerial display of a fictional character formed by multirotors/drones".
- On August 22, 2024, Budapest celebrated Saint Stephen's Day with a groundbreaking event that seamlessly blended tradition and innovation. The festivities featured a 30-minute drone light show over the Danube River, where 1,300 drones formed intricate formations and animations, synchronized with a curated soundtrack blending traditional Hungarian music and modern compositions. This innovative display was a collaborative effort between Grizzly Drones, Portugal's Ignition Concept, and Hungary's Visual Europe Group, seamlessly integrating with a traditional fireworks display to create a unified and immersive experience. The event highlighted Hungary's rich cultural heritage while embracing modern technological advancements, setting a new standard for public celebrations in Europe.
- September 26, 2024 - In Shenzhen, China, 10,197 drones were confirmed to be used in a drone show above Shenzhen Bay Park to celebrate National Day. Despite challenges from strong winds and heavy ionospheric interference, the Damoda team successfully set two Guinness World Records for “The most multirotor/drones airborne simultaneously from a single computer (outdoors)” and “The largest aerial image formed by multirotors/drones”.
- On October 5, 2024, Greek singer Anna Vissi celebrated her 50-year career with a record-breaking concert at Athens' Panathenaic Stadium, attended by over 65,000 fans—the largest audience for a Greek music concert. The event featured the stadium's first-ever drone light show, orchestrated by Grizzly Drones, Greece's first drone light show company. The drones were choreographed to synchronize with Vissi's iconic songs, forming shapes, lyrics, and symbols that complemented the live music.
- October 9, 2024 - In Las Vegas, fireworks and a drone show were held to honor the legacy of the Tropicana Las Vegas and the future home of the Athletics with an implosion.
- October 22, 2024 - BotLab Dynamics set five Guinness World Records at the Amaravati Drone Summit with a 5,500-drone light show, including the largest aerial vehicle display, largest aerial landmark (Amaravati Buddha Stupa), largest aerial display of the planet, largest aerial logo display (ICAO), and largest aerial image of a flag (Indian tricolor).

== 2025 ==
- On 10 January 2025, a drone show of about 400 drones lit up the Rotterdam skyline above the Erasmus Bridge as part of the opening ceremony for the restaurant Celest in the Zalmhaventoren, forming shapes like an outline of the Netherlands, a planet, and a replica of the tower itself.
- January 11, 2025 - BotLab Dynamics conducted a 3,000-drone light show in Muscat, Oman, marking the leadership anniversary of Sultan Haitham bin Tariq. The display included a drone-generated portrait of the Sultan along with themed formations representing national symbolism. It is regarded as the company’s first major project in the Middle East.
- July 5, 2025 - Croatian singer Marko Perković Thompson performed a concert at the Zagreb Hippodrome attended by over 500,000 people, making it the largest ticketed concert globally to date. The event featured the coordinated use of 1,000 drones displaying religious and national symbols, as well as notable quotations.
- On 28 July 2025, a drone light show in Chongqing by Chongqing Broadcasting Media Group Co., Ltd used 11,787 drones to form the largest aerial image ever created by multirotors/drones, setting a new Guinness World Record.
- On 14 September 2025, the “Grace for the World” drone show in Vatican City used around 3,000 drones above St. Peter’s to project Michelangelo’s masterpieces while featuring live music by Andrea Bocelli, Pharrell Williams, John Legend, choirs and speeches, concluding the third World Meeting on Human Fraternity.
- September 11, 2025 - 750-drone multi-city show was carried out across Delhi, Mumbai, Bengaluru, and Ahmedabad to mark Prime Minister Narendra Modi’s 75th birthday. BotLab Dynamics executed the synchronized displays, featuring portraits of the political leader and national symbols.
- On 18 September 2025, the “Efteling Grand Spectacle” took place after park closing at Efteling’s Meer van Fantasie, in a one-off evening show for staff and invited guests that combined fireworks, drones by Dronisos, music, dance and lights to celebrate recent major park developments, and marked the first drone show ever held in a Dutch theme park.
- September 28, 2025 - 2,983-drone display was presented during the Mysuru Dasara festival in Karnataka, executed by BotLab Dynamics. The show earned a Guinness World Record for the largest aerial image of a mammal formed by drones, with the 3D tiger being its most iconic and widely remembered formation.
- O1 November 2025 - A 5,000-drone opening ceremony was held at the Grand Egyptian Museum in Giza, Egypt. Not far from the Giza pyramid plateau, the long-awaited grand opening ceremony of the museum took place. It is the world's largest archaeological museum complex dedicated to a single civilization.
- November 1, 2025 - BotLab Dynamics presented a ~2,000-drone light show over Bhopal’s Lal Parade Ground to commemorate the 70th Madhya Pradesh Sthapana Diwas. The presentation depicted themes related to the state’s heritage, culture, wildlife, agriculture, and long-term development vision under the “Abhyudaya Madhya Pradesh 2047” initiative.

== 2026 ==
- February 2026 - EHang staged a large-scale drone display during the Hefei segment of the China Media Group Spring Festival Gala. The show featured 16 EH216-S pilotless eVTOL aircraft flying in formation alongside 22,580 GD4.0 drones. The display set a Guinness World Record for the largest number of multirotor drones flown simultaneously from a single computer. The event took place in Hefei.
- February 2026 - Apple TV commissioned and earned a Guinness World Record for the tallest aerial display of a fictional character formed by drones with 3,000 drones depicting Godzilla and King Kong. The show flew over Los Angeles to promote the second season release of Monarch: Legacy of Monsters.
- 27 March 2026 - The first Bluey-themed drone show was held at Alton Towers in Staffordshire, England, to celebrate the opening of the first Bluey roller coaster. It was the largest drone show performed in front of an audience in the United Kingdom.
- 30 March 2026 - 950 UVify IFO drones, operated by Celestial and commissioned by the BBC as part of its Made of Here campaign, recreated a full-scale, 1:1 replica of the RMS Titanic above Belfast Harbour, marking the anniversary of the ship’s departure and highlighting its historical connection to the city. The display received widespread media coverage and international attention.
- 23 May 2026 - The world's largest drone light show took place, in the Chinese city of Dujiangyan (Sichuan Province). A swarm of exactly 33,615 drones simultaneously took to the night sky, setting two official Guinness World Records.
- On June 10, 2026, a grand drone and light show took place over the Sagrada Família in Barcelona, marking the 100th anniversary of the death of architect Antoni Gaudí and the consecration of the Tower of Jesus Christ by Pope Leo XIV.
- On September 9, 2026, a commemorative drone light show titled "2,977 Lights Over New York Harbor" illuminated the Lower Manhattan skyline ahead of the 25th anniversary of the September 11 attacks.
- On November 18, 2026, a drone show titled "A Night in Vice City" a collaboration between Rockstar Games and the Miami Heat basketball club—took place over Biscayne Bay in Miami, ahead of the November 19, 2026, release of Grand Theft Auto VI.
