= Damoda =

Chinese technology company

Damoda, officially known as Shenzhen DAMODA Intelligent Control Technology Co., Ltd (Chinese: 深圳大漠大智控技术有限公司), is a technology company based in Shenzhen, Guangdong, China. Founded in 2016, it supplies drone swarm control solutions.

It broke the Guinness World Record for the largest drone display twice, first in 2021 with 3,051 drones and then in September 2024 with 10,197 drones. The latter performance overcame challenges such as strong winds and ionospheric interference.
