= Swarm robotic platforms =

Swarm robotic platforms apply swarm robotics in multi-robot collaboration. They take inspiration from nature (e.g. collective problem solving mechanisms seen in nature such as honey bee aggregation). The main goal is to control a large number of robots (with limited sensing/processing ability) to accomplish a common task/problem. Hardware limitation and cost of robot platforms limit current research in swarm robotics to mostly performed by simulation software (e.g. Stage, ARGoS). On the other hand, simulation of swarm scenarios that needs large numbers of agents is extremely complex and often inaccurate due to poor modelling of external conditions and limitation of computation.

== Comparison of platforms ==
Several mobile robot platforms have previously been developed to study swarm applications.

| Robot | Sensor / Module | Motion/ Max. Speed | Size/Diameter | Autonomy Time | University/Institute | Open source software | Open source hardware | Description | Image |
|---|---|---|---|---|---|---|---|---|---|
| AMiR | distance, light, bearing | wheel, 10 cm/s | 6.5 cm | 2 h | University Putra Malaysia | | Yes | AMiR is a low-cost swarm robotic platform, developed as an open-source / open-hardware mobile robot. Many researches mostly on honeybee aggregation (BEECLUST) was conducted with AMiR (e.g. Fuzzy decisioning). | |
| Alice | distance, camera | wheel, 4 cm/s | 2.2 cm | 10 h | École Polytechnique Fédérale de Lausanne (EPFL), Switzerland | | | Alice is a swarm robotic platform built in a very small package size. Alice has been used in many swarm research applications such as the embodiment of cockroach aggregation. | The Alice microrobot |
| Cellulo | structured dense pattern sensing camera, capacitive touch | omnidirectional ball wheel, 20 cm/s | 7.5 cm | 1-2 h | École Polytechnique Fédérale de Lausanne (EPFL), Switzerland | | | Cellulo is one of the world's first tangible swarm robot platforms, combining autonomous swarms with haptic-enabled multi-user tangible interaction. Initially invented as an educational platform, research is now being conducted on rehabilitation, gaming and human-computer interaction with Cellulo in addition to education. | Cellulo robots in a tangible swarm interaction scenario |
| Colias | distance, light, bump, bearing, range | wheel / 35 cm/s | 4 cm | 1-3 h | CIL at University of Lincoln, UK | | Yes | Colias is a low-cost open-source (open-hardware) platform that was developed for use in swarm robotic applications. | Swarm of Colias robot |
| Colias-III | Camera, distance, light, bump, bearing, range | wheel, 35 cm/s | 4 cm | 1-3 h | CIL at University of Lincoln, UK | | Yes | Colias-III is an extended version of the Colias micro-robot. It was mainly developed for implementation of bio-inspired vision systems. | Colias-III |
| Droplets | Light | vibration | 4.4 cm | 24h+ | Correll Lab at the University of Colorado | Yes | Yes | Droplets are an open hard- and software experimental platform for large-scale swarming research. The team raised funds via crowdfunding to build 1000 of these 'Droplets'. Infinite experiments due to a powered floor that doubles as global communication medium for swarm programming. | |
| E-puck | distance, camera, bearing, accele, mic | wheel / 13 cm/s | 7.5 cm | 1-10 h | École Polytechnique Fédérale de Lausanne (EPFL), Switzerland | Yes | Yes | E-puck is one of the most successful robots and was primarily designed for educational purposes. However, due to its simplicity, it is frequently employed in swarm robotics research as well. It has user replaceable batteries and an autonomy time of 2-4 h. | e-puck mobile robot |
| Jasmine | distance, light, bearing | wheel, N/A | 3 cm | 1-2 h | University of Stuttgart, Germany | Yes | Yes | Jasmine is a swarm robotic platform which was used in many swarm robotic researches. | Swarm of open-source Jasmine micro-robots |
| Kilobot | distance, light | vibration, 1 cm/s | 3.3 cm | 3 - 24 h | Harvard University, USA | Yes | Yes | Kilobot is a relatively recent swarm robotic platform with novel functions such as group charging and group programming. Due to its simplicity and low power consumption, it has a long autonomy time of up to 24 h. Robots are charged manually in groups in a special charging station. | |
| Kobot | distance, bearing, vision, compass | wheel, N/A | 12 cm | 10 h | KOVAN Research Lab, Middle East Technical University, Turkey | | | Kobot is a mobile robot specifically designed for swarm robotic research. It has several sensors that makes it an ideal platform for implementing various swarm robotic scenarios such as coordinated motion. It has approximately 10 h of autonomy time. It has a user replaceable battery which is recharged manually. It has been used in implementation of a self-organised flocking scenario. | |
| Mona | distance, bump, range, RF | wheel, 5 cm/s | 6.5 cm | Perpetual | The University of Manchester, UK | Yes | Yes | Mona is an open-source robot mainly designed to test the proposed Perpetual Robotic Swarm. It has been designed as a modular platform allowing deployment of additional modules that are attached on top of the platform, such as wireless communication or a vision board. Latest version of the robot was developed as a robotic platform for education and research purposes. | Mona robot platform |
| Pogobot | light, directional high-throughput IR, gyro, accelerometer, magnetometer | vibration, 5cm/s wheel, 20cm/s | 6 cm | 1-2h | Sorbonne University, France | Yes | Yes | Pogobot, an open-source platform specifically designed for research at the interface of swarm robotics and active matter. Pogobot features vibration-based or wheel-based locomotion, fast and directional IR communication, and an array of sensors in a cost-effective package. The platform’s modular design and comprehensive API (incl. Pogosim, a dedicated simulator) facilitate the implementation of swarm intelligence and programmable active matter algorithms. | |
| R-One | light, IR, gyro, bump, accelerometer | wheel, 30 cm/s | 10 cm | 6 h | Rice University, USA | Yes | | R-one is a low-cost Robot for research and teaching purposes. It was used in several study on swarm robotics. | |
| S-bot | light, IR, position, force, speed, temp, humidity, acc., mic | treels | 12 cm | 2 h | École Polytechnique Fédérale de Lausanne (EPFL), Switzerland | | | S-bot is one of the most influential and capable swarm robotic platforms ever built. s-bots have a unique gripper design capable of gripping objects and other s-bots. They have an autonomy time of approximately 1 h. | |
| Spiderino | range, light, bearing (with extension) | six legs, 6 cm/s | 8 cm | 4-20 h | University of Klagenfurt, Austria | Yes | Yes | Spiderino is a low-cost research robot based on the locomotion unit of a Hexbug spider toy. The modification replaces the robot head with a 3D-printed adapter, consisting of two parts to provide space for sensors, a larger battery, and a printed circuit board (PCB) with an Arduino microcontroller, Wi-Fi module, and motor controller. | |
| SwarmBot | range, bearing, camera, bump | wheel, 50 cm/s | 12.7 cm | 3 h | Rice University, USA | | | SwarmBot is another successful platform developed for swarm robotics research. It has approximately 3 h of autonomy time and robots are able to find and dock to charging stations which are placed on walls. | |
| Acoustic Swarm | microphone, speaker, IMU | wheel, 44 cm/s | 3 cm | 1-3 h | University of Washington, USA | Yes | Yes | Acoustic swarm is a platform where tiny robots cooperate with each other using acoustic signals to navigate with centimeter-level accuracy. The swarm devices spread out across a surface as well as navigate back to the charging station where they can be recharged. | |
