= Swarm robotics =

Coordination of multiple robots as a system

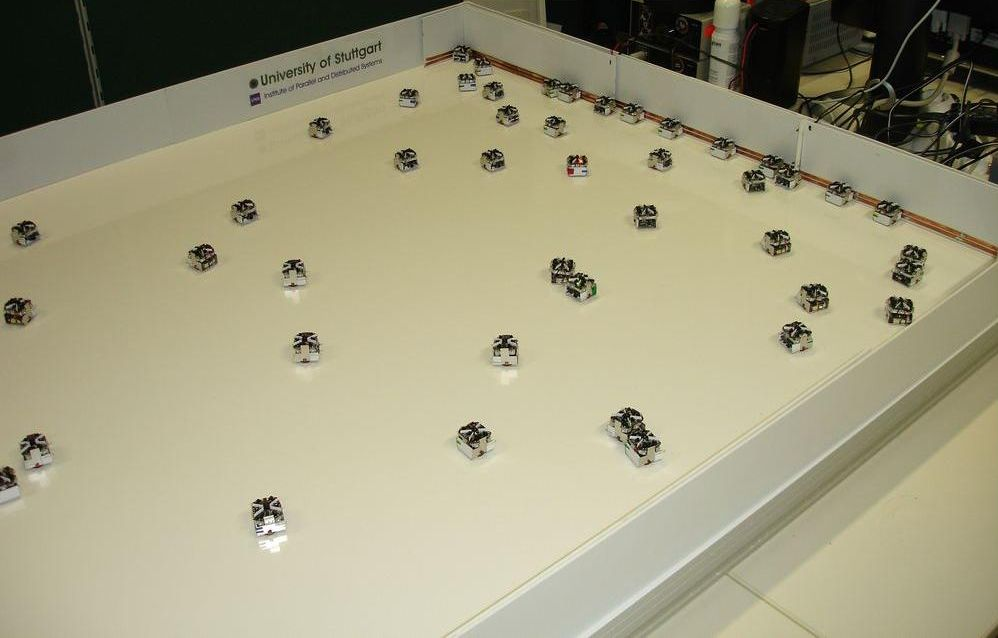
Swarm of open-source Jasmine micro-robots recharging themselves

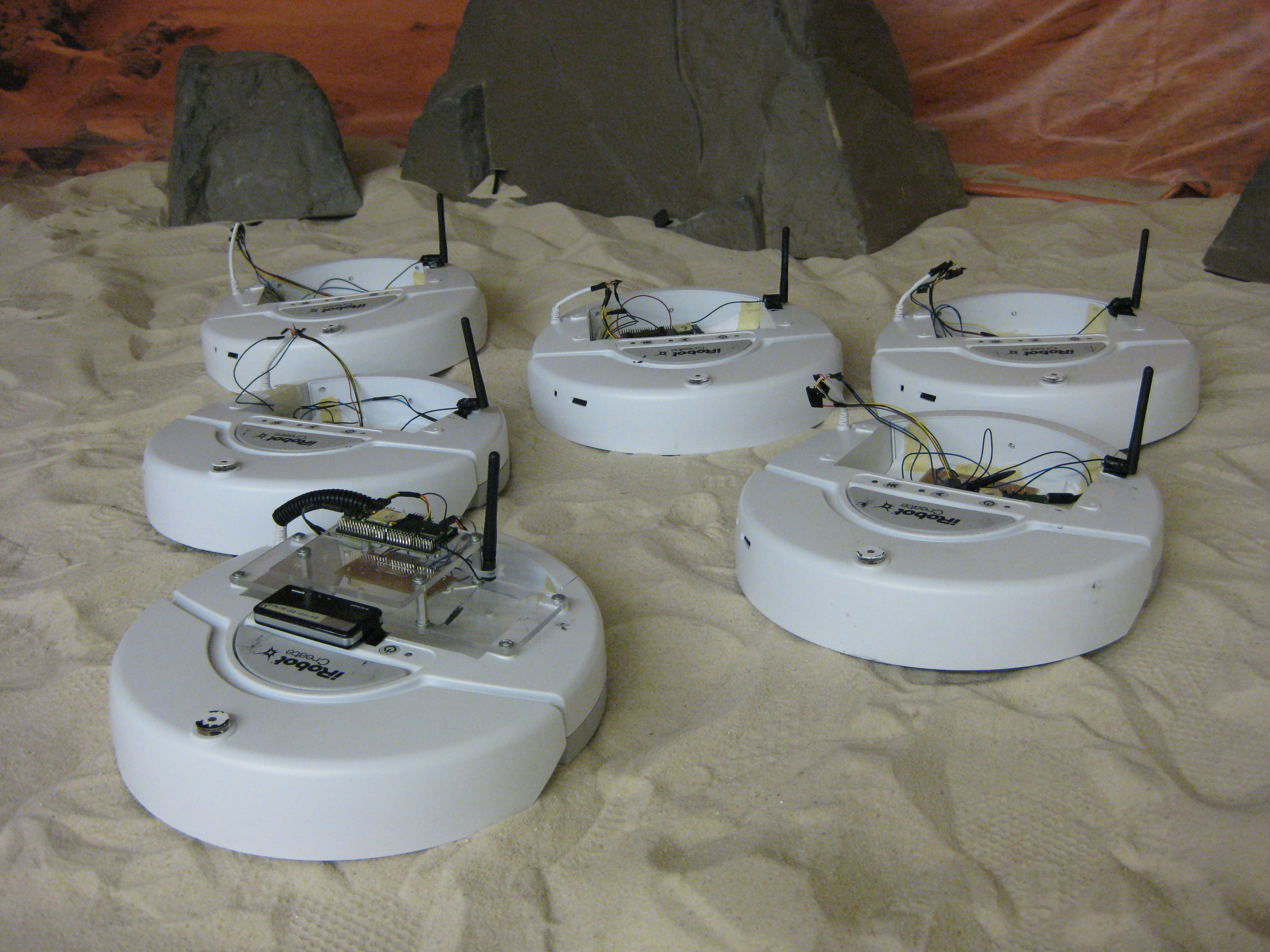
A team of iRobot Create robots at the Georgia Institute of Technology

Swarm robotics is the study of how to design independent systems of robots without centralized control. The emerging swarming behavior of robotic swarms is created through the interactions between individual robots and the environment. This idea emerged on the field of artificial swarm intelligence, as well as the studies of insects, ants and other fields in nature, where swarm behavior occurs.

Relatively simple individual rules can produce a large set of complex swarm behaviors. A key component is the communication between the members of the group that build a system of constant feedback. The swarm behavior involves constant change of individuals in cooperation with others, as well as the behavior of the whole group.

== Key Attributes of Robotic Swarms ==
The design of swarm robotics systems is guided by swarm intelligence principles, which promote fault tolerance, scalability, and flexibility. Unlike distributed robotic systems in general, swarm robotics emphasizes a large number of robots. While various formulations of swarm intelligence principles exist, one widely recognized set includes:

1. Robots are autonomous.
2. Robots can interact with the surroundings and give feedback to modify the environment.
3. Robots possess local perceiving and communicating capabilities, such as Wireless transmission systems, like radio frequency or infrared.
4. Robots do not exploit centralized swarm control or global knowledge.
5. Robots cooperate with each other to accomplish the given task.

Miniaturization is also key factor in swarm robotics, as the effect of thousands of small robots can maximize the effect of the swarm-intelligent approach to achieve meaningful behavior at swarm-level through a greater number of interactions on an individual level.

Compared with individual robots, a swarm can commonly decompose its given missions to their subtasks; a swarm is more robust to partial failure and is more flexible with regard to different missions.

== History ==
The phrase "swarm robotics" was reported to have first appeared in 1991, according to Google Scholar, but research regarding swarm robotics began to grow in the early 2000s. The initial goal of studying swarm robotics was to test whether the concept of stigmergy could be used as a method for robots to indirectly communicate and coordinate with each other.

One of the first international projects regarding swarm robotics was the SWARM-BOTS project funded by the European Commission between 2001 and 2005, in which a swarm of up to 20 of robots capable of independently physically connect to each other to form a cooperating system were used to study swarm behaviors such as collective transport, area coverage, and searching for objects. The result was demonstration of self-organized teams of robots that cooperate to solve a complex task, with the robots in the swarm taking different roles over time. This work was then expanded upon through the Swarmanoid project (2006–2010), which extended the ideas and algorithms developed in Swarm-bots to heterogeneous robot swarms composed of three types of robots—flying, climbing, and ground-based—that collaborated to carry out a search and retrieval task.

== Applications ==
There are many potential applications for swarm robotics. They include tasks that demand miniaturization (nanorobotics, microbotics), like distributed sensing tasks in micromachinery or the human body. A promising use of swarm robotics is in search and rescue missions. Swarms of robots of different sizes could be sent to places that rescue-workers cannot reach safely, to explore the unknown environment and solve complex mazes via onboard sensors. Swarm robotics can also be suited to tasks that demand cheap designs, for instance mining or agricultural shepherding tasks.

=== Drone swarms ===
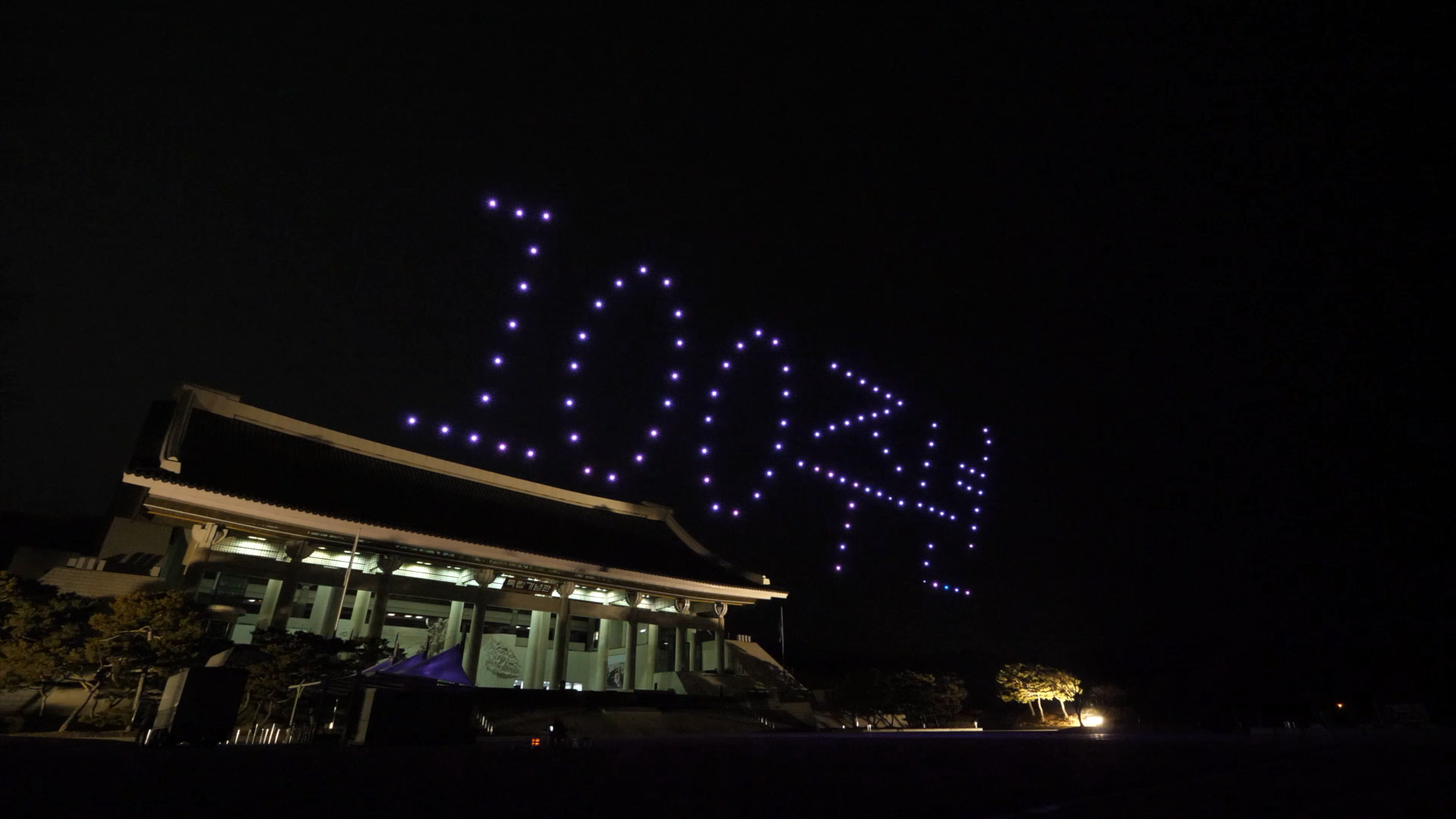
A 100 drone swarm flight commemorating the 100th anniversary of Korean independence movement by the Korea Aerospace Research Institute

Drone swarms are used in target search, drone displays, and delivery. A drone display commonly uses multiple, lighted drones at night for an artistic display or advertising. A delivery drone swarm can carry multiple packages to a single destination at a time and overcome a single drone's payload and battery limitations. A drone swarm may undertake different flight formations to reduce overall energy consumption due to drag forces.

Drone swarming can also introduce additional control issues connected to human factors and the swarm operator. Examples of this include high cognitive demand and complexity when interacting with multiple drones due to changing attention between different individual drones. Communication between operator and swarm is also a central aspect.

=== Military swarms ===
More controversially, swarms of military robots can form an autonomous army. U.S. Naval forces have tested a swarm of autonomous boats that can steer and take offensive actions by themselves. The boats are unmanned and can be fitted with any kind of kit to deter and destroy enemy vessels.

During the Syrian Civil War, Russian forces in the region reported attacks on their main air force base in the country by swarms of fixed-wing drones loaded with explosives.

=== Miniature swarms ===
Another large set of applications may be solved using swarms of micro air vehicles, which are also broadly investigated nowadays. In comparison with the pioneering studies of swarms of flying robots using precise motion capture systems in laboratory conditions, current systems such as Shooting Star can control teams of hundreds of micro aerial vehicles in outdoor environment using GNSS systems (such as GPS). Numerous works on cooperative swarms of unmanned ground and aerial vehicles have been conducted with target applications of simultaneous localization and mapping and moving target localization and tracking.

==== Acoustic swarms ====
In 2023, University of Washington and Microsoft researchers demonstrated acoustic swarms of tiny robots that create shape-changing smart speakers. These can be used for manipulating acoustic scenes to focus on or mute sounds from a specific region in a room. Here, tiny robots cooperate with each other using sound signals, without any cameras, to navigate cooperatively with centimeter-level accuracy. These swarm devices spread out across a surface to create a distributed and reconfigurable wireless microphone array. They also navigate back to the charging station where they can be automatically recharged.

==== Kilobot ====
Most efforts have focused on relatively small groups of machines. However, a Kilobot swarm consisting of 1,024 individual robots was demonstrated by Harvard in 2014, the largest to date.

==== LIBOT ====
Another example of miniaturization is the LIBOT Robotic System that involves a low cost robot built for outdoor swarm robotics. The robots are also made with provisions for indoor use via Wi-Fi, since the GPS sensors provide poor communication inside buildings.

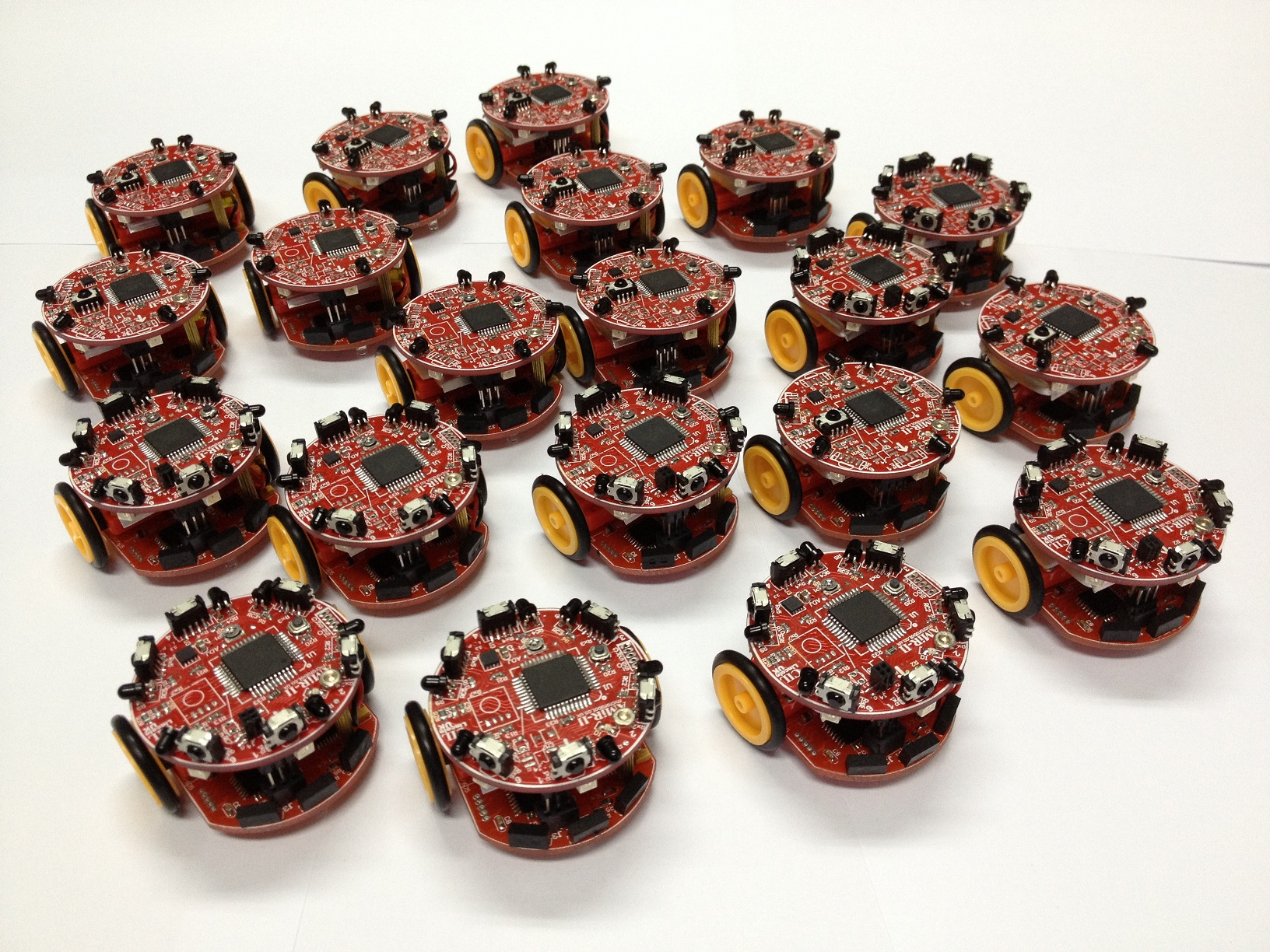
A swarm of open source micro Colias robots

==== Colias ====
Another such attempt is the micro robot (Colias), built in the Computer Intelligence Lab at the University of Lincoln, UK. This micro robot is built on a 4 cm circular chassis and is a low-cost and open platform for use in a variety of swarm robotics applications.

=== Manufacturing swarms ===
Additionally, progress has been made in the application of autonomous swarms in the field of manufacturing, known as swarm 3D printing. This is particularly useful for the production of large structures and components, where traditional 3D printing is not able to be utilized due to hardware size constraints. Miniaturization and mass mobilization allows the manufacturing system to achieve scale invariance, not limited in effective build volume. While in its early stage of development, swarm 3D printing is currently being commercialized by startup companies.

== See also ==
- Ant robotics – Special case of swarm robotics
- Autonomous agent – Type of autonomous entity in softwares
- Behavior-based robotics – Branch of robotics
- Flocking (behavior) – Swarming behaviour of birds when flying or foraging
- Gray Goo – Hypothetical end-of-the-world scenario
- Kilobot – Swarm robots developed at Harvard University
- List of emerging technologies – New technologies actively in development
- Microbotics – Branch of robotics
- Multi-agent system – System of multiple interacting agents
- Nanorobotics – Emerging technology field
- Nanotechnology in fiction – Fictional uses of nanotechnology
- Physicomimetics – Physics-based swarm intelligence
- Quadcopter – Helicopter with four rotors
- Robotic materials
- Shooting Star (drone)
- Swarm intelligence – Collective behavior of decentralized, self-organized systems
- Swarm robotic platforms
- Unconventional computing – Computing by new or unusual methods
- Unmanned aerial vehicle – Aircraft without any human pilot on board
