= Studio Drift =

Dutch art collective

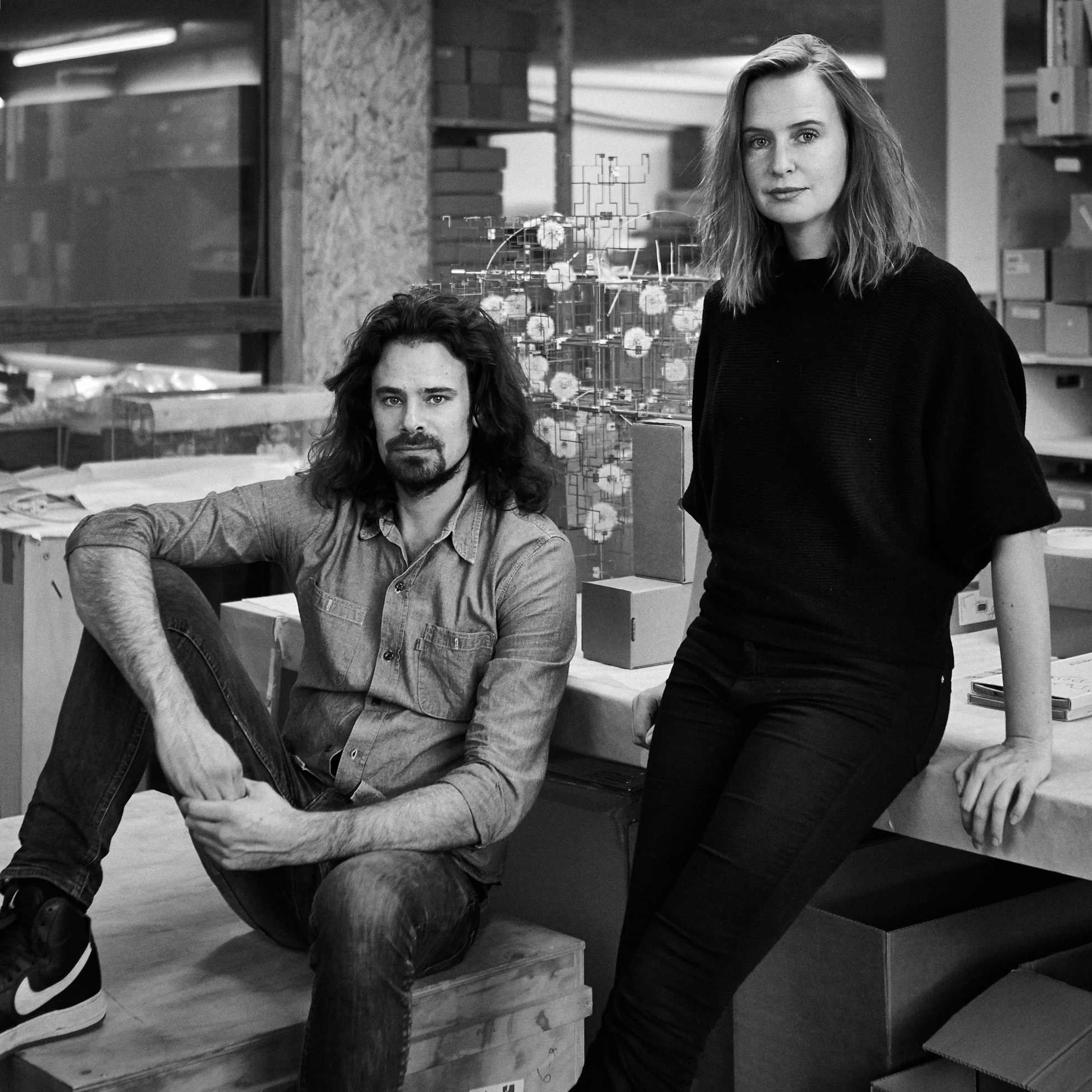
- Lonneke Gordijn and Ralph Nauta, founders Studio Drift
- Formation: 2007; 19 years ago
- Founders: Ralph Nauta, Lonneke Gordijn
- Type: Artist collective
- Location: Amsterdam
- Website: studiodrift.com

Studio Drift is an Amsterdam-based artist duo founded by Ralph Nauta and Lonneke Gordijn in 2007. It specializes in choreographed sculptures and kinetic installations.

== History ==
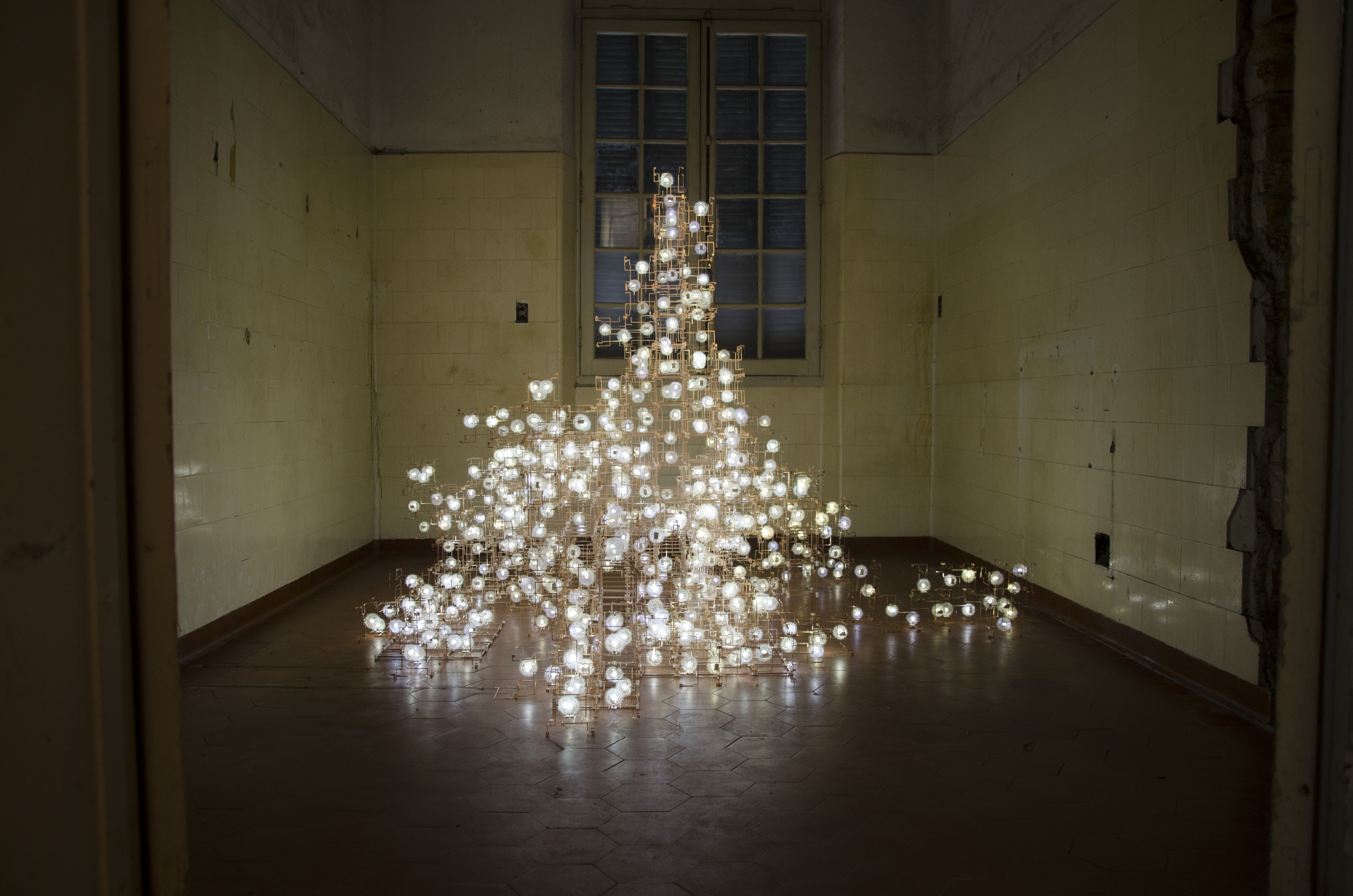
Fragile Future, by Studio Drift. 31st São Paulo Biennale, Brazil, 2014

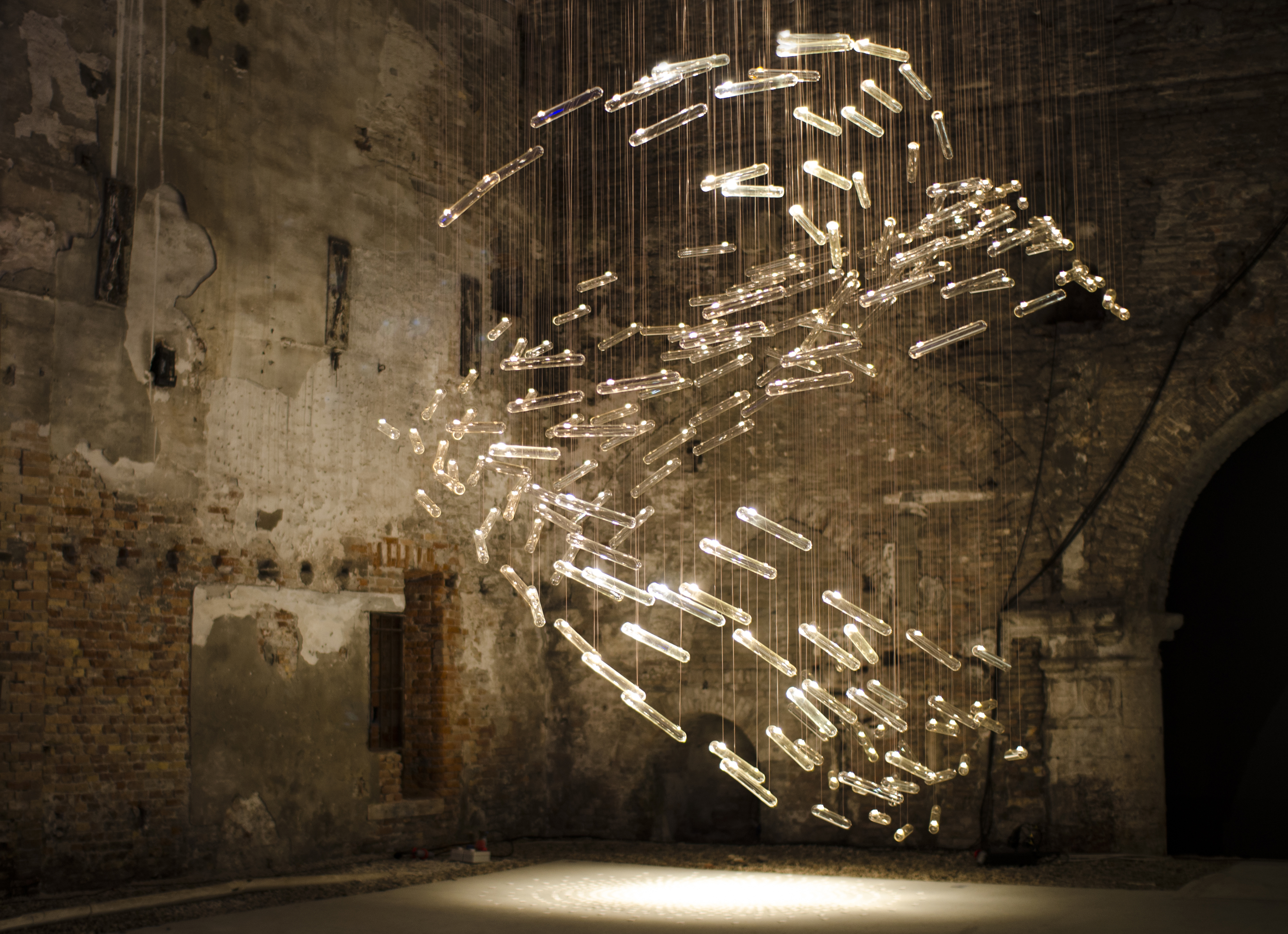
Flylight, by Studio Drift. Glasstress 2015 Gotika, Venice Biennale Photo: by Juuke Schoorl

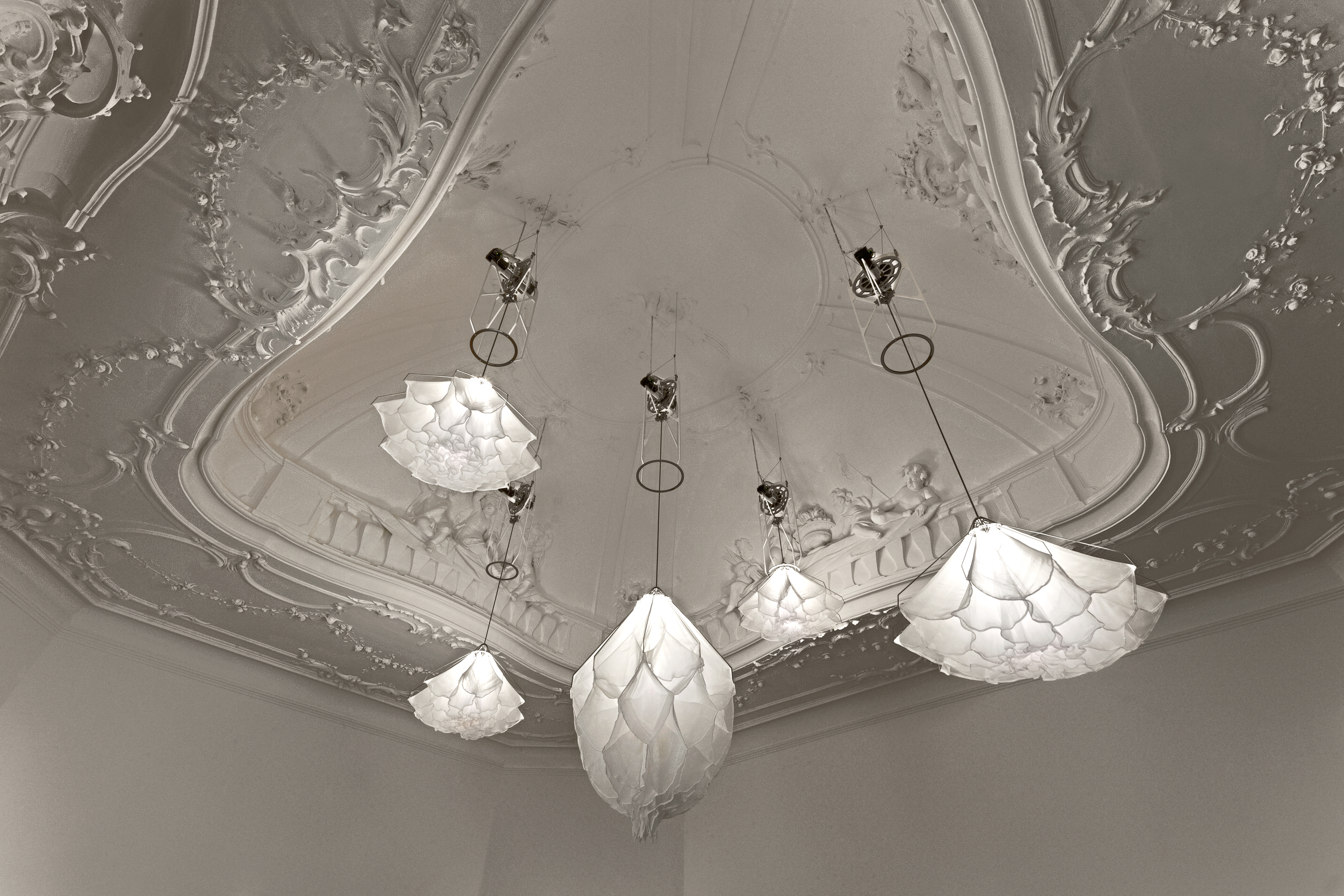
Shylight, by Studio Drift at Rijksmuseum, Amsterdam (NL) 2014 Photo: by Hesmerg

Studio Drift was founded in 2007 by Design Academy Eindhoven graduates Ralph Nauta and Lonneke Gordijn. They first collaborated on Gordijn's graduation project, Fragile Future, a number of ball-shaped LED lamps with real dandelion seeds glued onto them, giving the bulbs a flowerlike appearance. Designers also created a miniature lamp Dandelight, following the same concept.

Fragile Future won Light of the Future award from the German Design Council (Rat für Formgebung) in 2008 and later different versions of this art work were included into permanent collections of Stedelijk Museum and Victoria and Albert museum. It was displayed in many cities globally including New York (2010), Jeruzalem (2011), Abu Dhabi (2013), São Paulo, (2014) London (2015). and in Venice during the Art Biennale (2019)

Studio Drift's first commercial project was a series of outdoor benches made in 2007 for the Amsterdam Botanical Gardens named the Water Web Bench. In 2008, artists presented their Ghost Chair at the Milan Furniture Fair.

In 2010, the duo was invited to New York to make Fragile Future installation for the Dead or Alive exhibition at the Museum of Arts and Design.

In 2011, studio showed their kinetic art project Flylight during the Salone del Mobile and later in 2012 at the Venice Biennale of Architecture. The computer-controlled installation, that draws inspiration from the flock of birds, is composed of as many as 180 hand-blown glass tubes suspended from cables and outfitted with halogen lamps. It was commissioned for several private residential projects.

In 2013, artistic duo presented first prototypes of Nola lighting system during the Dutch Design Week. In 2014, the studio presented a standing mirror named The Obsidian Mirror made out of the toxic waste during Salone del Mobile. In October 2015, a second piece from this collection, a hanging wall mirror, was shown at Thing Nothing exhibition at Van Abbemuseum. In late October 2014, when Philips Wing of Rijksmuseum in Amsterdam opened after the 11-year renovation it featured studio's Shylight chandeliers.

In 2015, artists installed a grand-scale kinetic sculpture named In 20 Steps at Berengo Foundation's Centre for Contemporary Art and Glass during Art Biennale in Venice. This art object was re-created in 2018 for the Abu Dhabi Edition hotel.

In 2017, Studio Drift presented two projects in the US: in March they displayed a giant levitating concrete cube during the Armory Show in New York and in December launched 300 drones to form a flying light sculpture named Franchise Freedom during Art Basel Miami with sister company Drone Stories. Franchise Freedom was an evolution of their earlier Flylight project. This project won THE DESIGN PRIZE (established by Designboom and Abitare magazine) and was nominated for the Beazley Designs of the Year 2018 award.

In April 2018, Stedelijk Museum Amsterdam hosted the first solo exhibition of Studio Drift projects. In 2019, newly opened art museum Amos Rex hosted their second solo exhibition and their works were shown during the Venice Art Biennale in the exhibition Dysfunctional.

In 2019, DRIFT won the Dezeen Awards for ‘Designer of the Year’ and ‘Lighting design of the year’ with the artwork Franchise Freedom.

Later during the year, DRIFT had their operatic debut. DRIFT artist Lonneke Gordijn - together with director Monique Wagemakers and Choreographer Nanine Linning - deconstructs the traditional codes of opera through the creation of Ego. Ego is a time-based kinetic sculpture in the signature block form of the art studio. Initially, the sculpture was created to materialize the internal turmoil of Orfeo, the protagonist of the famous opera, on the stage. In March 2020, Ego had its debut off-stage at PACE Gallery in New York.

On 5 May 2020, during the Liberation Day in the Netherlands, a special performance of Franchise Freedom flew over the city of Rotterdam. The artist duo prepared the special custom show to celebrate freedom during the coronavirus crisis.

In 2023, Drift Studio announced opening a museum in Amsterdam in 2025, in the Van Gendt Hallen, a project that reflects "the outcome of everything we have been working towards for the past 17 years" according to its founders.

== Works ==
- Fragile Future (2006)
- Dandelight (2007)
- Water Web Bench (2007)
- Ghost Collection (2008)
- Fragile Future III (2009)
- Shylight (2010)
- Flylight (2011)
- Nola (2013)
- The Particle Plan (2014)
- The Obsidian Project (2014)
- In 20 Steps (2015)
- Semblance (2016)
- Amplitude (2017)
- Concrete Storm (2017)
- In 20 Little Steps (2017)
- Meadow (2017)
- Drifter (2017)
- Franchise Freedom (2017)
- Materialism (2018)
- Ego (2020)

== Works at museums ==
Year	Museum / Collection	City	Object
2012	Stedelijk Museum	Amsterdam	Fragile Future Chandelier
2014	Rijksmuseum	Amsterdam	Shylight
2015	Victoria and Albert museum	London	Fragile Future Concrete Chandelier (2011)
2015	San Francisco Museum of Modern Art	San Francisco	Ghost chair

== Exhibitions and fairs ==
Year	Type of event	Name	Place	City
2008	Fair	Milan Furniture Fair	NHow hotel	Milan
2010	Exhibition	Dead or Alive	Museum of Arts and Design	New York
2011	Fair	Milan Furniture Fair	Ventura Lambrate	Milan
2011	Exhibition	Curious Minds: New Approaches in Design	The Israel Museum	Jeruzalem
2012	Fair	Design Days Dubai		Dubai
2012	Exhibition	Nieuwe energie in design en kunst	Museum Boijmans van Beuningen	Rotterdam
2013	Fair	Abu Dhabi Art		Abu Dhabi
2014	Installation	Made by... Feito por Brasileiros	Cidade Matarazzo	São Paulo
2015	Exhibition	Thing Nothing	Van Abbemuseum	Amsterdam
2015	Installation	In 20 Steps	Berengo Foundation's Centre for Contemporary Art and Glass	Venice
2015	Exhibition	What is Luxury?	Victoria and Albert Museum	London
2016	Exhibition	Dream Out Loud	Stedelijk Museum	Amsterdam
2017	Fair	Drifter	Armory Show	New York
2017	Performance	Franchise Freedom	Art Basel	Miami
2018	Exhibition	Coded Nature	Stedelijk Museum	Amsterdam
2020	Performance	Franchise Freedom	Liberation Day	Rotterdam
2022	Retrospective	Rhythms of Nature: The Art & Design of DRIFT	Philadelphia Museum of Art	Philadelphia

== Publications ==
- Studio Drift (2022). DRIFT : choreographing the future. London. ISBN 978-1-83866-171-7. OCLC 1346321150.
- Maria Cristina Didero (January 25, 2018). "Studio Drift: dream big and think of the improbable". Domus.
