= Ant robotics =

Special case of swarm robotics

Ant robotics is a special case of swarm robotics. Swarm robots are simple (and therefore likely to be cost-effective) robots with limited sensing and computational capabilities. This makes it feasible to deploy teams of swarm robots and take advantage of the resulting fault tolerance and parallelism. Swarm robots cannot use conventional planning methods due to their limited sensing and computational capabilities. Thus, their behavior is often driven by local interactions. Ant robots are swarm robots that can communicate via markings, similar to ants that lay and follow pheromone trails. Some ant robots use long-lasting trails (either regular trails of a chemical substance or smart trails of transceivers). Others use short-lasting trails including heat and alcohol. Others even use virtual trails.

== Invention ==
In 1991, American electrical engineer James McLurkin was the first to conceptualize the idea of "robot ants" while working at the MIT Computer Science and Artificial Intelligence Laboratory at the Massachusetts Institute of Technology. The robots consisted of sensors, infrared emitters, and communication systems capable of detecting objects in their path. McLurkin's invention was through studying the behavior of real ants in ant colonies and keeping ant farms as a basis for his programming. Through this examination, he could better understand how insects structured their workloads in order to produce a viable and working prototype of robotic ants.

== Background ==
Researchers have developed ant robot hardware and software and demonstrated, both in simulation and on physical robots, that single ant robots or teams of ant robots solve robot-navigation tasks (such as path following and terrain coverage) robustly and efficiently. For example, trails coordinate the ant robots via implicit communication and provide an alternative to probabilistic reasoning for solving the simultaneous localization and mapping problem.

Researchers have also developed a theoretical foundation for ant robotics, based on ideas from real-time heuristic search, stochastic analysis and graph theory.

== See also ==
- Swarm intelligence, especially ant colony optimization
