= Physicomimetics =

Physics-based swarm intelligence

Physicomimetics is physics-based swarm (computational) intelligence. The word is derived from physike (φυσική, Greek for "the science of physics") and mimesis (μίμησις, Greek for "imitation"). Physicomimetrics is related to Biosemiotics and Swarm Intelligence.

== Overview ==
In response to growing concerns that single monolithic robotic vehicles are expensive, brittle, and vulnerable, there has been a trend towards the development of distributed networks of small, inexpensive vehicles. The capability of these networks to dynamically monitor and sense environmental conditions while maintaining cost-effectiveness, robustness, and flexibility, is considered to be among their greatest assets.

Dynamic sensor networks are critically needed for various tasks such as search and rescue, surveillance, perimeter defense, locating and mapping of chemical and biological hazards, virtual space telescopes, automated assembly of micro-electromechanical systems, and medical surgery (e.g., with nanobots).

The core technology used to achieve these goals is a novel approach referred to as "artificial physics" or "physicomimetics". With physicomimetics, robotic agents perceive and react to artificial physics forces. By synthesizing the appropriate virtual forces, various important task-driven behaviors can be effectively achieved, such as lattice-shaped distributed antennas, perimeter defense, and dynamic surveillance. Furthermore, the systems self-organize, can self-repair, and are fault-tolerant. Recently the paradigm has been adapted to function optimization.

The motivation for this approach is that any system designed using the laws of physics is amenable to the full gamut of empirical, analytical, and theoretical analysis tools used by physicists. This approach was first introduced by Professors William Spear and Diana Spears at the Naval Research Laboratory and the University of Wyoming. The first paper on this approach was published by them in 1999 at the IEEE International Conference on Information, Intelligence, and Systems. and the title was "Using Artificial Physics to Control Agents".

== See also ==
- Swarm robotics
