= Drone art =

Images drawn in the sky by drones carrying colored lights

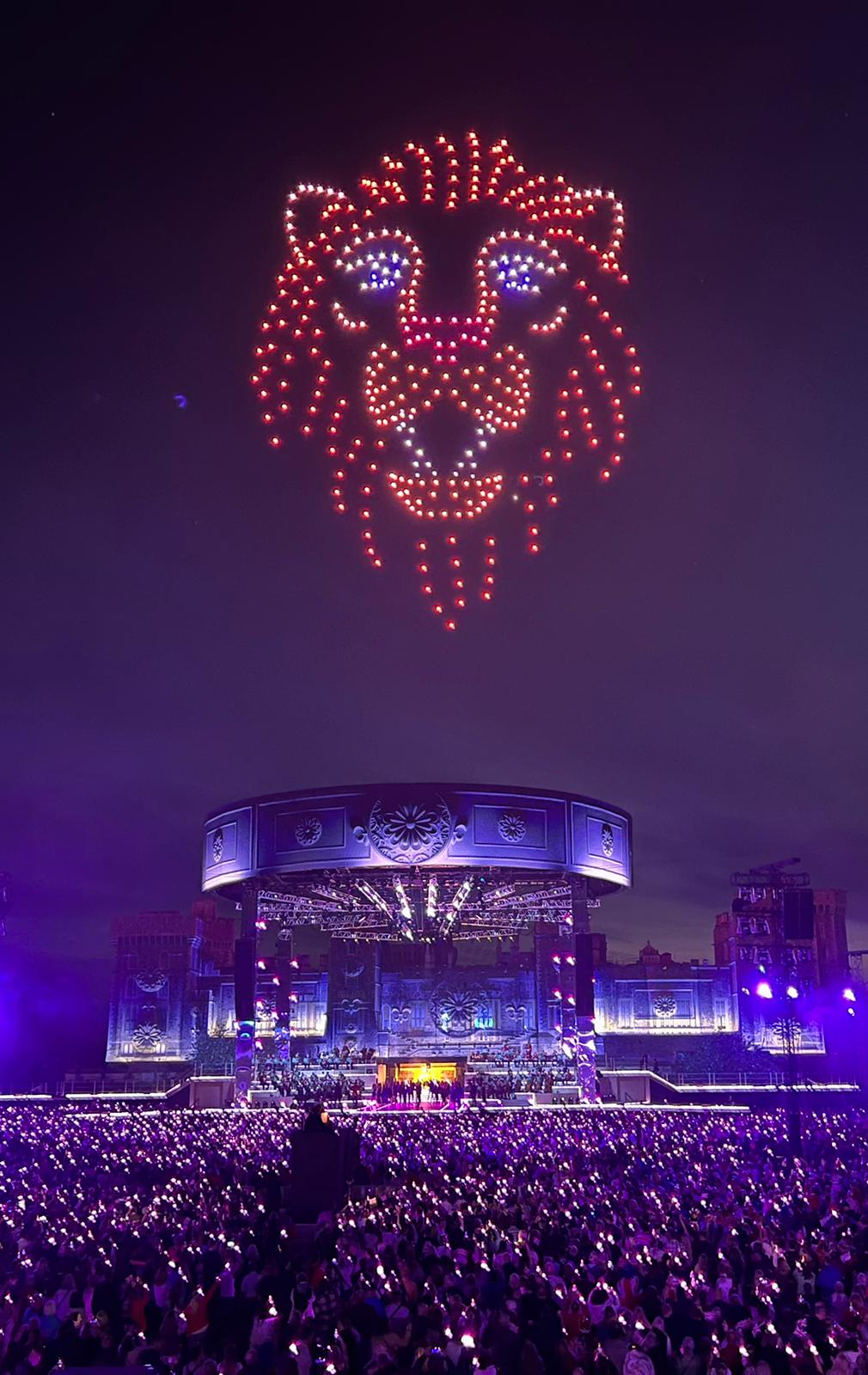
Crowds watch a drone show at the Coronation Concert at Windsor Castle.

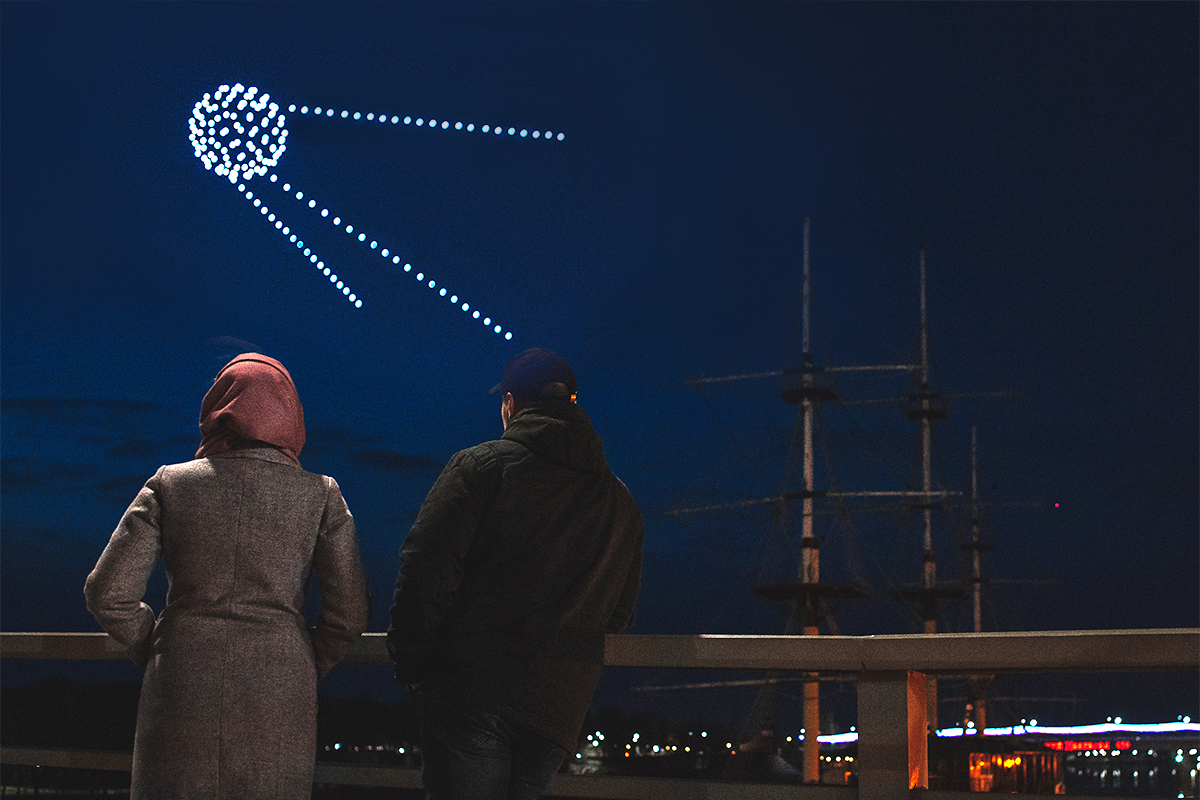
A drone launch in Velikiy Novgorod, Russia, to celebrate the 60th anniversary of Yuri Gagarin's flight to space in 1961

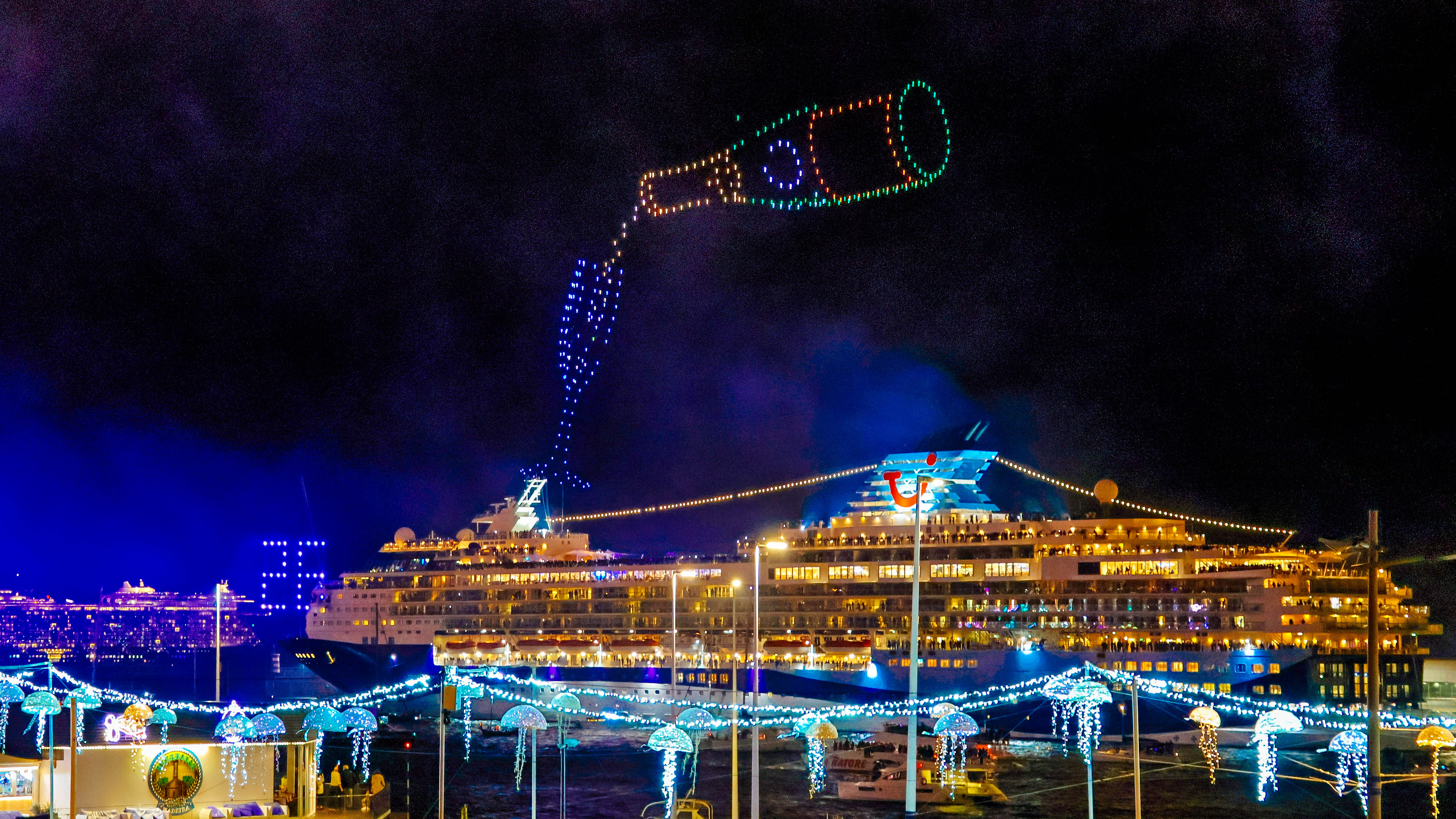
Drone show on New Year's Eve at the harbor of Funchal (Madeira)

Drone art (also known as drone display or drone light show) is the use of multiple unmanned aerial vehicles (drones), often quadcopters which fly in a coordinated fashion with light fixtures attached. They are usually equipped with multiple LEDs and the display is held at night.

Drone light shows differ from fireworks displays in that drones are reusable; they do not produce air and noise pollution. However, drone displays cannot happen during rain or strong winds.

== History ==
The first drone display was presented in June 2012 in Cannes, France; Marshmallow Laser Feast presented Meet Your Creator at the Saatchi & Saatchi New Directors' Showcase for the Cannes Lions International Festival of Creativity.

Intel has produced the Shooting Star, a type of drone used in light shows. The drones were used during the 2018 Winter Olympics, a Super Bowl halftime show in 2017, and a 2018 Fourth of July celebration.

In the 2020s, some cities in the United States replaced Independence Day fireworks displays with drone or laser light shows, to reduce fire risk, air pollution, and the disturbance of dogs and people with PTSD. Concerns about safety have also emerged in response to malfunctioning of public drone light displays, such as prior to a match in the 2023 FIFA Women's World Cup, 350 of the 500 performing drones plunged into the water due to a glitch.

In December 2024, a missing flight path information led to some of drones to collide into each other in a 500-drone Orlando, Florida show. Many drones fell; one of them landed on a seven-year-old boy, causing heart damage that required an open-heart surgery.

== Drone displays ==
Drone displays are typically used for entertainment or advertising. The drones may use flocking or swarming behaviour. Real-time kinematic positioning (RTK) technology is used for precise relative positioning of the drones to centimeter scale or better. Each drone has a preprogrammed flight path for its role in producing the images.

Drone shows are using more and more drones every year as technology advances. Listed below are those notable for breaking records, using new technologies, or otherwise gaining significance. For a more comprehensive overview, see List of drone displays.

Date	Location	Notes
2015	Linz, Austria	Drone100 at Ars Electronica in collaboration with Intel, one of the first large-scale shows using 100 SPAXELS LED drones.
2018	Pyeongchang, South Korea	Opening ceremony of the 2018 Winter Olympics, featuring 1,218 drones and setting a world record at the time.
2020	Zhuhai, China	Guinness World Record with 3,051 drones flown simultaneously.
2023	New Delhi, India	Beating Retreat ceremony with 3,500 drones, one of the largest shows worldwide.
2024	Shenzhen, China	Record-breaking display with 10,197 drones, the largest number flown simultaneously from a single computer system and the largest aerial images formed by drones.

== Drone teams ==
- Ars Electronica Futurelab

== See also ==
- Aerial advertising
- Son et lumière (show)
- Laser lighting display
- Light art
- Swarm robotics
