= Table of metaheuristics =

Chronological table of metaheuristic algorithms

This is a chronological table of metaheuristic algorithms that only contains fundamental computational intelligence algorithms. Hybrid algorithms and multi-objective algorithms are not listed in the table below.

== Categories ==
- Evolutionary-based
- Trajectory-based
- Nature-inspired
  - Swarm-based
  - Bio-inspired
  - Physics/Chemistry-based
  - Human-based
  - Plant-based
- Art-inspired
- Ancient-inspired

== The table ==
Name	Abbreviation	Main category	Subcategory	Year published	Ref.
Simulated Annealing	SA	Trajectory-based	-	1983	
Tabu Search	TS	Trajectory-based	-	1989	
Genetic Algorithm	GA	Evolutionary-based	-	1992	
Evolutionary Algorithm	EA	Evolutionary-based	-	1994	
Cultural Algorithm	CA			1994	
Particle Swarm Optimization	PSO	Nature-inspired	Swarm-based	1995	
Differential Evolution	DE	Evolutionary-based	-	1997	
Local Search	LS			1997	
Variable neighborhood search	VNS	Trajectory-based	-	1997	
Guided Local Search	GLS	Trajectory-based	-	1998	
Clonal Selection Algorithm	CSA	Evolutionary-based	-	2000	
Harmony Search	HS	Evolutionary-based	-	2001	
Memetic Algorithm	MA	Evolutionary-based	-	2002	
Iterative Local Search	ILS	Trajectory-based	-	2003	
Artificial Bee Colony	ABC	Nature-inspired	Bio-inspired	2005	
Ant Colony Optimization	ACO	Nature-inspired	Bio-inspired	2006	
Glowworm Swarm Optimization	GSO	Nature-inspired	Swarm-based	2006	
Shuffled Frog Leaping Algorithm	SFLA	Nature-inspired	Bio-inspired	2006	
Invasive Weed Optimization	IWO	Nature-inspired	Plant-based	2006	
Seeker Optimization Algorithm	SOA	Nature-inspired	Human-based	2006	
Imperialistic Competitive Algorithm	ICA	Nature-inspired	Human-based	2007	
Central Force Optimization	CFO			2007	
Biogeography Based Optimization	BBO	Nature-inspired	Human-based	2008	
Firefly Algorithm	FA	Nature-inspired	Bio-inspired	2008	
Intelligent Water Drops	IWD	Nature-inspired	Swarm-based	2008	
Monkey Algorithm	MA	Nature-inspired	Bio-inspired	2008	
Cuckoo Search	CS	Nature-inspired	Bio-inspired	2009	
Group Search Optimizer	GSO	Nature-inspired	Swarm-based	2009	
Key Cutting Algorithm	KCA			2009	
Hunting Search	HS	Nature-inspired	Swarm-based	2009	
Chemical Reaction Optimization	CRO	Nature-inspired	Physics/Chemistry-based	2009	
Bat Algorithm	BA	Nature-inspired	Bio-inspired	2010	
Charged System Search	CSS	Nature-inspired	Physics/Chemistry-based	2010	
Eagle Strategy	ES	Nature-inspired		2010	
Fireworks Algorithm	FWA			2010	
Cuckoo Optimization Algorithm	COA	Nature-inspired	Bio-inspired	2011	
Stochastic Diffusion Search	SDS			2011	
Teaching-Learning-Based Optimization	TLBO	Nature-inspired	Human-based	2011	
Bacterial Colony Optimization	BCO			2012	
Fruit Fly Optimization	FFO			2012	
Krill Herd Algorithm	KHA	Nature-inspired	Bio-inspired	2012	
Migrating Birds Optimization	MBO	Nature-inspired	Swarm-based	2012	
Water Cycle Algorithm	WCA			2012	
Backtracking Search Algorithm	BSA	Evolutionary-based	-	2013	
Black Hole Algorithm	BH	Nature-inspired	Physics/Chemistry-based	2013	
Dolphin Echolocation	DE	Nature-inspired	Bio-inspired	2013	
Animal Migration Optimization	AMO	Nature-inspired	Swarm-based	2013	
Keshtel Algorithm	KA	Nature-inspired		2014	
SDA Optimization Algorithm	SDA	Nature-inspired	Bio-inspired	2014	
Artificial Root Foraging Algorithm	ARFA	Nature-inspired	Plant-based	2014	
Bumble Bees Mating Optimization	BBMO			2014	
Chicken Swarm Optimization	CSO	Nature-inspired	Bio-inspired	2014	
Colliding Bodies Optimization	CBO			2014	
Coral Reefs Optimization Algorithm	CROA			2014	
Flower Pollination Algorithm	FPA	Nature-inspired	Plant-based	2014	
Radial Movement Optimization	RMO	Nature-inspired	Swarm-based	2014	
Spider Monkey Optimization	SMO	Nature-inspired	Bio-inspired	2014	
Soccer League Competition	SLC	Nature-inspired	Human-based	2014	
Artificial Algae Algorithm	AAA			2015	
Adaptive Dimensional Search	ADS			2015	
Alienated Ant Algorithm	AAA			2015	
Artificial Fish Swarm Algorithm	AFSA	Nature-inspired		2015	
Bottlenose Dolphin Optimization	BDO	Nature-inspired		2015	
Cricket Algorithm	CA			2015	
Elephant Search Algorithm	ESA	Nature-inspired	Bio-inspired	2015	
Grey Wolf Optimizer	GWO	Nature-inspired	Bio-inspired	2015	
Jaguar Algorithm	JA	Nature-inspired	Bio-inspired	2015	
Locust Swarm Algorithm	LSA	Nature-inspired	Swarm-based	2015	
Moth-Flame Optimization	MFO	Nature-inspired	Bio-inspired	2015	
Stochastic Fractal Search	SFF	Evolutionary-based	-	2015	
Vortex Search Algorithm	VSA	Nature-inspired	Physics/Chemistry-based	2015	
Water Wave Optimization	WWA	Nature-inspired	Physics/Chemistry-based	2015	
Ant Lion Optimizer	ALO	Nature-inspired	Bio-inspired	2015	
African Buffalo Optimization	ABO	Nature-inspired	Swarm-based	2015	
Lightning Search Algorithm	LSA	Nature-inspired	Physics/Chemistry-based	2015	
Across Neighborhood Search	ANS	Evolutionary-based	-	2016	
Crow Search Algorithm	CSA	Nature-inspired	Bio-inspired	2016	
Electromagnetic Field Optimization	EFO	Nature-inspired	Physics/Chemistry-based	2016	
Joint Operations Algorithm	JOA	Nature-inspired	Swarm-based	2016	
Lion Optimization Algorithm	LOA	Nature-inspired	Bio-inspired	2016	
Sine Cosine Algorithm	SCA	Nature-inspired	Physics/Chemistry-based	2016	
Virus Colony Search	VCS	Nature-inspired	Bio-inspired	2016	
Whale Optimization Algorithm	WOA	Nature-inspired	Bio-inspired	2016	
Red Deer Algorithm	RDA	Nature-inspired	Bio-inspired	2016	
Phototropic Optimization Algorithm	POA	Nature-inspired	Plant-based	2018	
Coyote Optimization Algorithm	COA	Nature-inspired	Swarm-based	2018	
Owl Search Algorithm	OSA	Nature-inspired	Bio-inspired	2018	
Squirrel Search Algorithm	SSA	Nature-inspired	Bio-inspired	2018	
Social Engineering Optimizer	SEO	Nature-inspired	Human-based	2018	
Emperor Penguin Optimizer	EPO	Nature-inspired	Bio-inspired	2018	
Socio Evolution and Learning Optimization	SELO	Nature-inspired	Human-based	2018	
Future Search Algorithm	FSA	Nature-inspired	Human-based	2019	
Emperor Penguins Colony	EPC	Nature-inspired	Swarm-based	2019	
Thermal Exchange Optimization	TEO	Nature-inspired	Physics/Chemistry-based	2019	
Harris Hawks Optimization	HHO	Nature-inspired	Bio-inspired	2019	
Political Optimizer	PO	Nature-inspired	Human-based	2020	
Heap-Based Optimizer	HBO	Nature-inspired	Human-based	2020	
Color Harmony Algorithm	CHA	Art-inspired	Color-based	2020	
Stochastic Paint Optimizer	SPO	Art-inspired	Color-based	2020	
Mayfly Optimization Algorithm	MOA	Nature-inspired	Bio-inspired	2020	
Giza Pyramids Construction	GPC	Ancient-inspired	-	2020	
Fire Hawk Optimizer	FHO	Nature-inspired	Bio-inspired	2022	
Flying Fox Optimization Algorithm	FFO	Nature-inspired	Bio-inspired	2023	
Waterwheel Plant Algorithm	WWPA	Nature-inspired	Plant-based	2023	
Energy Valley Optimizer	EVO	Nature-inspired	Physics/Chemistry-based	2023	
Special Forces Algorithm	SFA	Nature-inspired	Swarm-based	2023	
Squid Game Optimizer	SGO	Nature-inspired	Human-based	2023	
Snow Ablation Optimizer	SAO	Nature-inspired	Physics/Chemistry-based	2023	
Spider Wasp Optimization	SWO	Nature-inspired	Bio-inspired	2023	
Dujiangyan Irrigation System	DISO	Ancient-inspired	-	2023	
Great Wall Construction Algorithm	GWCA	Ancient-inspired	-	2023	
Puma Optimizer	PO	Nature-inspired	Bio-inspired	2024	
Walrus Optimizer	WO	Nature-inspired	Bio-inspired	2024	
Divine Religions Algorithm	DRA	Evolutionary-based	-	2025	
Tianji’s Horse Racing Optimization	THRO	Ancient-inspired	-	2025	
Schrödinger Optimizer	SRA	Nature-inspired	Physics/Chemistry-based	2025	
Stellar Oscillation Optimizer	SOO	Nature-inspired	Physics/Chemistry-based	2025	
Dhole Optimization Algorithm	DOA	Nature-inspired	Bio-inspired	2025	
Hannibal Barca Optimizer	HBO	Ancient-inspired	-	2025	
Octopus Optimization Algorithm	OOA	Nature-inspired	Bio-inspired	2025	
Bitterling Colony Optimization	BCO	Nature-inspired	Bio-inspired	2025	
Star Death	SD	Nature-inspired	Physics/Chemistry-based	2025	
