= Constructive cooperative coevolution =

Algorithm in AI

The constructive cooperative coevolutionary algorithm (also called C^{3}) is a global optimisation algorithm in artificial intelligence based on the multi-start architecture of the greedy randomized adaptive search procedure (GRASP). It incorporates the existing cooperative coevolutionary algorithm (CC). The considered problem is decomposed into subproblems. These subproblems are optimised separately while exchanging information in order to solve the complete problem. An optimisation algorithm, usually but not necessarily an evolutionary algorithm, is embedded in C^{3} for optimising those subproblems. The nature of the embedded optimisation algorithm determines whether C^{3}'s behaviour is deterministic or stochastic.

The C^{3} optimisation algorithm was originally designed for simulation-based optimisation but it can be used for global optimisation problems in general. Its strength over other optimisation algorithms, specifically cooperative coevolution, is that it is better able to handle non-separable optimisation problems.

An improved version was proposed later, called the Improved Constructive Cooperative Coevolutionary Differential Evolution (C^{3i}DE), which removes several limitations with the previous version. A novel element of C^{3i}DE is the advanced initialisation of the subpopulations. C^{3i}DE initially optimises the subpopulations in a partially co-adaptive fashion. During the initial optimisation of a subpopulation, only a subset of the other subcomponents is considered for the co-adaptation. This subset increases stepwise until all subcomponents are considered. This makes C^{3i}DE very effective on large-scale global optimisation problems (up to 1000 dimensions) compared to cooperative coevolutionary algorithm (CC) and Differential evolution.

The improved algorithm has then been adapted for multi-objective optimization.

== Algorithm ==
As shown in the pseudo code below, an iteration of C^{3} exists of two phases. In Phase I, the constructive phase, a feasible solution for the entire problem is constructed in a stepwise manner. Considering a different subproblem in each step. After the final step, all subproblems are considered and a solution for the complete problem has been constructed. This constructed solution is then used as the initial solution in Phase II, the local improvement phase. The CC algorithm is employed to further optimise the constructed solution. A cycle of Phase II includes optimising the subproblems separately while keeping the parameters of the other subproblems fixed to a central blackboard solution. When this is done for each subproblem, the found solution are combined during a "collaboration" step, and the best one among the produced combinations becomes the blackboard solution for the next cycle. In the next cycle, the same is repeated. Phase II, and thereby the current iteration, are terminated when the search of the CC algorithm stagnates and no significantly better solutions are being found. Then, the next iteration is started. At the start of the next iteration, a new feasible solution is constructed, utilising solutions that were found during the Phase I of the previous iteration(s). This constructed solution is then used as the initial solution in Phase II in the same way as in the first iteration. This is repeated until one of the termination criteria for the optimisation is reached, e.g. a maximum number of evaluations.

{Sphase1} ← ∅
while termination criteria not satisfied do
    if {Sphase1} = ∅ then
        {Sphase1} ← SubOpt(∅, 1)
    end if
    while pphase1 not completely constructed do
        pphase1 ← GetBest({Sphase1})
        {Sphase1} ← SubOpt(pphase1, inext subproblem)
    end while
    pphase2 ← GetBest({Sphase1})
    while not stagnate do
        {Sphase2} ← ∅ 
        for each subproblem i do
            {Sphase2} ← SubOpt(pphase2,i)
        end for
        {Sphase2} ← Collab({Sphase2})
        pphase2 ← GetBest({Sphase2})
    end while
end while

== Multi-objective optimisation ==
The multi-objective version of the C^{3} algorithm is a Pareto-based algorithm which uses the same divide-and-conquer strategy as the single-objective C^{3} optimisation algorithm. The algorithm again starts with the advanced constructive initial optimisations of the subpopulations, considering an increasing subset of subproblems. The subset increases until the entire set of all subproblems is included. During these initial optimisations, the subpopulation of the latest included subproblem is evolved by a multi-objective evolutionary algorithm. For the fitness calculations of the members of the subpopulation, they are combined with a collaborator solution from each of the previously optimised subpopulations. Once all subproblems' subpopulations have been initially optimised, the multi-objective C^{3} optimisation algorithm continues to optimise each subproblem in a round-robin fashion, but now collaborator solutions from all other subproblems' subspopulations are combined with the member of the subpopulation that is being evaluated. The collaborator solution is selected randomly from the solutions that make up the Pareto-optimal front of the subpopulation. The fitness assignment to the collaborator solutions is done in an optimistic fashion (i.e. an "old" fitness value is replaced when the new one is better).

== Applications ==
The constructive cooperative coevolution algorithm has been applied to different types of problems, e.g. a set of standard benchmark functions, optimisation of sheet metal press lines and interacting production stations. The C^{3} algorithm has been embedded with, amongst others, the differential evolution algorithm and the particle swarm optimiser for the subproblem optimisations.

== See also ==
- Cooperative coevolution
- Metaheuristic
- Stochastic search
- Differential evolution
- Swarm intelligence
- Genetic algorithms
- Hyper-heuristics
