= Greedy randomized adaptive search procedure =

Metaheuristic commonly used for optimization problems

The greedy randomized adaptive search procedure (also known as GRASP) is a metaheuristic algorithm commonly applied to combinatorial optimization problems. GRASP typically consists of iterations made up from successive constructions of a greedy randomized solution and subsequent iterative improvements of it through a local search. The greedy randomized solutions are generated by adding elements to the problem's solution set from a list of elements ranked by a greedy function according to the quality of the solution they will achieve. To obtain variability in the candidate set of greedy solutions, well-ranked candidate elements are often placed in a restricted candidate list (RCL), and chosen at random when building up the solution. This kind of greedy randomized construction method is also known as a semi-greedy heuristic, first described in Hart and Shogan (1987).

GRASP was first introduced in Feo and Resende (1989). Survey papers on GRASP include Feo and Resende (1995), and Resende and Ribeiro (2003).

There are variations of the classical algorithm, such as the Reactive GRASP. In this variation, the basic parameter that defines the restrictiveness of the RCL during the construction phase is self-adjusted according to the quality of the solutions previously found. There are also techniques for search speed-up, such as cost perturbations, bias functions, memorization and learning, and local search on partially constructed solutions.

== See also ==
- Constructive cooperative coevolution
- Cooperative coevolution
- Local search (optimization)
- Metaheuristic
- Simulated annealing
- Tabu search
