= Firefly algorithm =

Metaheuristic proposed by Xin-She Yang

In mathematical optimization, the firefly algorithm is a metaheuristic proposed by Xin-She Yang and inspired by the flashing behavior of fireflies.

== Algorithm ==
In pseudocode the algorithm can be stated as:

Begin
    1) Objective function: f(𝐱),𝐱=(x1,x2,...,xd);
    2) Generate an initial population of fireflies 𝐱i(i=1,2,…,n);.
    3) Formulate light intensity I so that it is associated with f(𝐱)
       (for example, for maximization problems, I∝f(𝐱) or simply I=f(𝐱);)
    4) Define absorption coefficient γ

    while (t < MaxGeneration)
        for i = 1 : n (all n fireflies)
            for j = 1 : i (n fireflies)
                if (Ij>Ii),
                    Vary attractiveness with distance r via exp⁡(−γr);
                    move firefly i towards j;                
                    Evaluate new solutions and update light intensity;
                end if 
            end for j
        end for i
        Rank fireflies and find the current best;
    end while
end

Note that the number of objective function evaluations per loop is one evaluation per firefly, even though the above pseudocode suggests it is n×n. (Based on Yang's MATLAB code.) Thus the total number of objective function evaluations is (number of generations) × (number of fireflies).

The main update formula for any pair of two fireflies $\mathbf{x}_i$ and $\mathbf{x}_j$ is
$$\mathbf{x}_i^{t+1}=\mathbf{x}_i^t + \beta \exp[-\gamma r_{ij}^2] (\mathbf{x}_j^t - \mathbf{x}_i^t) +\alpha_t \boldsymbol{\epsilon}_t$$
where $\alpha_t$ is a parameter controlling the step size, while $\boldsymbol{\epsilon}_t$ is a vector drawn from a Gaussian or other distribution.

It can be shown that the limiting case $\gamma \rightarrow 0$ corresponds to the standard particle swarm optimization (PSO). In fact, if the inner loop (for j) is removed and the brightness $I_j$ is replaced by the current global best $g^*$, then FA essentially becomes the standard PSO.

== Criticism ==
Nature-inspired metaheuristics in general have attracted criticism in the research community for hiding their lack of novelty behind metaphors. The firefly algorithm has been criticized as differing from the well-established particle swarm optimization only in a negligible way.

== See also ==
- Swarm intelligence
