= Xin-She Yang =

British mathematician

Xin-She Yang is Reader_(academic_rank) at the Middlesex University and was a senior research scientist at National Physical Laboratory, best known as a developer of various heuristic algorithms for engineering optimization. He obtained a DPhil in applied mathematics from Oxford University. He has given many invited keynote talks, including SEA2011, SCET2012, BIOMA2012, Mendel Conference on Soft Computing (Mendel 2012), ICCS2015 (Iceland), SIBGRAPH2015 (Brazil), OIPE2016 (Italy), ICICT2019 (UK), CIS2022 (India), and SIMULTECH2024 (France). He has been elected as a Fellow of the Institute of Mathematics and its Application in 2021. He has been on the prestigious list of Highly Cited Researchers since 2016 by Clarivate Analyatics/Web of Science. He is also on the latest list of World's Best Scientistis 2026 (Best Computer Science Scientists 2026), according to Research.com

== Algorithms ==
He created the firefly algorithm (2008), cuckoo search (2009), bat algorithm (2010), and flower pollination algorithm (2012).

Since 2009, more than 16000 peer-reviewed research papers cited the firefly algorithm and/or cuckoo search.
