= Guided local search =

Guided local search is a metaheuristic search method. A meta-heuristic method is a method that sits on top of a local search algorithm to change its behavior.

Guided local search builds up penalties during a search. It uses penalties to help local search algorithms escape from local minima and plateaus. When the given local search algorithm settles in a local optimum, GLS modifies the objective function using a specific scheme (explained below). Then the local search will operate using an augmented objective function, which is designed to bring the search out of the local optimum. The key is in the way that the objective function is modified.

The method in its current form was developed by Dr Christos Voudouris and detailed in his PhD Thesis. GLS was inspired by and extended GENET, a neural network architecture for solving Constraint Satisfaction Problems, which was developed by Chang Wang, Edward Tsang and Andrew Davenport. Both GLS's and GENET's mechanism for escaping from local minima resembles reinforcement learning.

== Overview ==
=== Solution features ===
To apply GLS, solution features must be defined for the given problem. Solution features are defined to distinguish between solutions with different characteristics, so that regions of similarity around local optima can be recognized and avoided. The choice of solution features depends on the type of problem, and also to a certain extent on the local search algorithm. For each feature $f_i$ a cost function $c_i$ is defined.

Each feature is also associated with a penalty $p_i$ (initially set to 0) to record the number of occurrences of the feature in local minima.

The features and costs often come directly from the objective function. For example, in the traveling salesman problem, “whether the tour goes directly from city X to city Y” can be defined to be a feature. The distance between X and Y can be defined to be the cost. In the SAT and weighted MAX-SAT problems, the features can be “whether clause C is satisfied by the current assignments”.

At the implementation level, we define for each feature $i$ an Indicator Function $I_i$ indicating whether the feature is present in the current solution or not. $I_i$ is 1 when solution $x$ exhibits property $i$, 0 otherwise.

=== Selective penalty modifications ===
GLS computes the utility of penalising each feature. When the local search algorithm returns a local minimum x, GLS penalizes all those features (through increments to the penalty of the features) present in that solution which have maximum utility, $\operatorname{util}(x,i)$, as defined below.

$$\operatorname{util}(x,i) = I_i(x)\frac{c_i(x)}{1+p_i}.$$

The idea is to penalise features that have high costs, although the utility of doing so decreases as the feature is penalised more and more often.

=== Searching through an augmented cost function ===
GLS uses an augmented cost function (defined below), to allow it to guide the local search algorithm out of the local minimum, through penalising features present in that local minimum. The idea is to make the local minimum more costly than the surrounding search space, where these features are not present.

$$g(x) = f(x) + \lambda a \sum_{1\leq i\leq m} I_i(x) p_i$$

The parameter λ may be used to alter the intensification of the search for solutions. A higher value for λ will result in a more diverse search, where plateaus and basins are searched more coarsely; a low value will result in a more intensive search for the solution, where the plateaus and basins in the search landscape are searched in finer detail. The coefficient $a$ is used to make the penalty part of the objective function balanced relative to changes in the objective function and is problem specific. A simple heuristic for setting $a$ is simply to record the average change in objective function up until the first local minimum, and then set $a$ to this value divided by the number of GLS features in the problem instance.

=== Extensions of guided local search ===
Mills (2002) has described an extended guided local search (EGLS) which utilises random moves and an aspiration criterion designed specifically for penalty based schemes. The resulting algorithm improved the robustness of GLS over a range of parameter settings, particularly in the case of the quadratic assignment problem. A general version of the GLS algorithm, using a min-conflicts based hill climber (Minton et al. 1992) and based partly on GENET for constraint satisfaction and optimisation, has also been implemented in the Computer-Aided Constraint Programming project.

Alsheddy (2011) extended guided local search to multi-objective optimization, and demonstrated its use in staff empowerment in scheduling.

== Related work ==
GLS was built on GENET, which was developed by Chang Wang, Edward Tsang and Andrew Davenport.

The breakout method is very similar to GENET. It was designed for constraint satisfaction.

Tabu search is a class of search methods which can be instantiated to specific methods. GLS can be seen as a special case of Tabu search.

By sitting GLS on top of genetic algorithm, Tung-leng Lau introduced the guided genetic programming (GGA) algorithm. It was successfully applied to the general assignment problem (in scheduling), processors configuration problem (in electronic design) and a set of radio-link frequency assignment problems (an abstracted military application).

Choi et al. cast GENET as a Lagrangian search.

== Bibliography ==
- Alsheddy, A., Empowerment scheduling: a multi-objective optimization approach using Guided Local Search, PhD Thesis, School of Computer Science and Electronic Engineering, University of Essex, 2011
- Choi, K.M.F., Lee, J.H.M. & Stuckey, P.J., A Lagrangian Resconstruction of GENET, Artificial Intelligence, 2000, 123(1-2), 1-39
- Davenport A., Tsang E.P.K., Kangmin Zhu & C J Wang, GENET: A connectionist architecture for solving constraint satisfaction problems by iterative improvement, Proc., AAAI, 1994, p. 325-330
- Lau, T.L. & Tsang, E.P.K., Solving the processor configuration problem with a mutation-based genetic algorithm, International Journal on Artificial Intelligence Tools (IJAIT), World Scientific, Vol.6, No.4, December 1997, 567-585
- Lau, T.L. & Tsang, E.P.K., Guided genetic algorithm and its application to radio link frequency assignment problems, Constraints, Vol.6, No.4, 2001, 373-398
- Lau, T.L. & Tsang, E.P.K., The guided genetic algorithm and its application to the general assignment problems, IEEE 10th International Conference on Tools with Artificial Intelligence (ICTAI'98), Taiwan, November 1998
- Mills, P. & Tsang, E.P.K., Guided local search for solving SAT and weighted MAX-SAT problems, Journal of Automated Reasoning, Special Issue on Satisfiability Problems, Kluwer, Vol.24, 2000, 205-223
- Mills, P. & Tsang, E.P.K. & Ford, J., Applying an Extended Guided Local Search on the Quadratic Assignment Problem, Annals of Operations Research, Kluwer Academic Publishers, Vol.118, 2003, 121-135
- Minton, S., Johnston, M., Philips, A.B. & Laird, P., Minimizing conflicts: a heuristic repair method for constraint satisfaction and scheduling problems, Artificial Intelligence (Special Volume on Constraint Based Reasoning), Vol.58, Nos.1-3 1992, 161-205
- Tsang, E.P.K. & Voudouris, C., Fast local search and guided local search and their application to British Telecom's workforce scheduling problem, Operations Research Letters, Elsevier Science Publishers, Amsterdam, Vol.20, No.3, March 1997, 119-127
- Voudouris, C., Tsang, E.P.K., Partial Constraint Satisfaction Problems and Guided Local Search, Proceedings of the Second International Conference on the Practical Application of Constraint Technology (PACT'96), pp 337-356, London, UK, 1996
- Voudouris, C, Guided local search for combinatorial optimisation problems, PhD Thesis, Department of Computer Science, University of Essex, Colchester, UK, July, 1997
- Voudouris, C., Guided Local Search—An illustrative example in function optimisation, BT Technology Journal, Vol.16, No.3, July 1998, 46-50
- Voudouris, C., Tsang, E., Solving the Radio Link Frequency Assignment Problems using Guided Local Search, In Proceedings of NATO symposium on Frequency Assignment, Sharing and Conservation in Systems (AEROSPACE), AGARD, paper No. 14, Aalborg, Denmark, 5-7 October 1998
- Voudouris, C. & Tsang, E.P.K., Guided Local Search and its application to the Travelling Salesman Problem, European Journal of Operational Research, Anbar Publishing, Vol.113, Issue 2, March 1999, 469-499
- Voudouris, C. & Tsang, E.P.K., Guided local search joins the elite in discrete optimisation, DIMACS Series in Discrete Mathematics and Theoretical Computer Science Volume 57, 2001, 29-39
- Voudouris, C. & Tsang, E.P.K., Guided local search, in F. Glover (ed.), Handbook of metaheuristics, Kluwer, 2003, 185-218
- Voudouris, C., Tsang, E.P.K. & Alsheddy, A., Guided local search, Chapter 11, in M. Gendreau & J-Y Potvin (ed.), Handbook of Metaheuristics, Springer, 2010, 321-361
- Voudouris, C., Tsang, E., Alsheddy, A., Guided Local Search, Wiley Encyclopedia of Operations Research and Management Science, Wiley, 2010
- Voudouris, C., Tsang, E., Alsheddy, A., Effective Application of Guided Local Search, Wiley Encyclopedia of Operations Research and Management Science, Wiley, 2010
