= Stochastic hill climbing =

Stochastic hill climbing is a variant of the basic hill climbing method. While basic hill climbing always chooses the steepest uphill move, "stochastic hill climbing chooses at random from among the uphill moves; the probability of selection can vary with the steepness of the uphill move."

== See also ==
- Stochastic gradient descent
