= Workforce modeling =

Workforce modeling is the process by which the need (demand) for skilled workers at a particular time is matched with the availability and preference of skilled workers (supply). The resulting mathematical models can be used to perform sensitivity analysis and generate reports and schedules.

Workforce modeling is generally found in industries that have complex work rules, skilled or certified workers, medium to large teams of workers, and fluctuating demand. Some examples include healthcare, public safety, and retail.

A workforce modeling solution can also refer to software demonstrating the number of staff necessary to complete tasks according to workload volumes/output by the time of day, day of the week, or time of year.

== Definition ==
The term can be differentiated from traditional staff scheduling. Research indicates that traditional static planning models result in 60% of operating hours being either understaffed, or overstaffed, while modern workforce modeling implementations have achieved substantial cost reductions. Staff scheduling is rooted in time management. Besides demand orientation, workforce modeling also incorporates the forecast of the workload and the required staff, the integration of workers into the scheduling process through interactivity, and analysis of the entire process. The evolution from traditional scheduling to workforce modeling demonstrated quantitative benefits and reflects broader technological advancement in organizational management.

== Complexity of the model ==
Many applications providing workforce modeling solutions might use the linear programming approach. Linear methods of achieving a schedule generally assume that demand is based on a series of independent events, each with a consistent, predictable outcome. Modeling the uncertainty and dependability of such events is a well-researched area. Modeling approaches such as system dynamics have been employed in workforce modeling to address interdependencies and feedback loops within large organizations, such as NASA. Heuristics have also been applied to the problem, and metaheuristics have been identified as effective methods for generating complex scheduling solutions.
