= Memetic algorithm =

Algorithm for searching a problem space

In computer science and operations research, a memetic algorithm (MA) is an extension of an evolutionary algorithm (EA) that aims to accelerate the evolutionary search for the optimum. An EA is a metaheuristic that reproduces the basic principles of biological evolution as a computer algorithm in order to solve challenging optimization or planning tasks, at least approximately. An MA uses one or more suitable heuristics or local search techniques to improve the quality of solutions generated by the EA and to speed up the search. The effects on the reliability of finding the global optimum depend on both the use case and the design of the MA.

Memetic algorithms represent one of the recent growing areas of research in evolutionary computation. The term MA is now widely used as a synergy of evolutionary or any population-based approach with separate individual learning or local improvement procedures for problem search. Quite often, MAs are also referred to in the literature as Baldwinian evolutionary algorithms, Lamarckian EAs, cultural algorithms, or genetic local search.

== Introduction ==
Inspired by both Darwinian principles of natural evolution and Dawkins' notion of a meme, the term memetic algorithm (MA) was introduced by Pablo Moscato in his technical report in 1989 where he viewed MA as being close to a form of population-based hybrid genetic algorithm (GA) coupled with an individual learning procedure capable of performing local refinements. The metaphorical parallels, on the one hand, to Darwinian evolution and, on the other hand, between memes and domain specific (local search) heuristics are captured within memetic algorithms thus rendering a methodology that balances well between generality and problem specificity. This two-stage nature makes them a special case of dual-phase evolution.

The basic idea behind an MA is to combine the advantages of a global search performed by an EA (or another global search method) with the local refinement provided by one or more local search techniques, while avoiding their drawbacks. The main disadvantage of EAs is that, when searching in the vicinity of an optimum, they perform poorly in determining the exact position of that optimum. The downside of local search methods lies simply in the locality of their search relative to the chosen starting point. The combination of these two classes of methods aims to merge global and local search so that the advantages of both approaches can be leveraged.

The idea of this approach can be illustrated by the search for the highest mountain in the Alps. A local search method would climb one of the mountains near the starting point, ignoring Mont Blanc as long as the starting point is not in its vicinity. An EA, on the other hand, will likely only find Mont Blanc after examining many other mountains, valleys, and hills, and then it will have difficulty identifying the summit cross. From the perspective of an MA's global search procedure, however, only the summits of hills and mountains are seen, and its search is limited to finding the best summit. The open question is whether the additional effort required for the local search is worthwhile. This depends not only on the design of the MA but also on the specific application and the local search methods used. In the context of complex optimization, many different instantiations of memetic algorithms have been reported across a wide range of application domains, in general, converging to high-quality solutions more efficiently than their conventional evolutionary counterparts.

In general, using the ideas of memetics within a computational framework is called memetic computing or memetic computation (MC). With MC, the traits of universal Darwinism are more appropriately captured. Viewed in this perspective, MA is a more constrained notion of MC. More specifically, MA covers one area of MC, in particular dealing with areas of evolutionary algorithms that marry other deterministic refinement techniques for solving optimization problems. MC extends the notion of memes to cover conceptual entities of knowledge-enhanced procedures or representations.

== Theoretical Background ==
The no-free-lunch theorems of optimization and search state that all optimization strategies are equally effective with respect to the set of all optimization problems. Conversely, this means that one can expect the following: The more efficiently an algorithm solves a problem or class of problems, the less general it is and the more problem-specific knowledge it builds on. This insight leads directly to the recommendation to complement generally applicable metaheuristics with application-specific methods or heuristics, which fits well with the concept of MAs.

== The development of MAs ==
=== 1st generation ===
Pablo Moscato characterized an MA as follows: "Memetic algorithms are a marriage between a population-based global search and the heuristic local search made by each of the individuals. ... The mechanisms to do local search can be to reach a local optimum or to improve (regarding the objective cost function) up to a predetermined level." And he emphasizes "I am not constraining an MA to a genetic representation.". This original definition of MA although encompasses characteristics of cultural evolution (in the form of local refinement) in the search cycle, it may not qualify as a true evolving system according to universal Darwinism, since all the core principles of inheritance/memetic transmission, variation, and selection are missing. This suggests why the term MA stirred up criticisms and controversies among researchers when first introduced. The following pseudo code would correspond to this general definition of an MA:

Pseudo code

   Procedure Memetic Algorithm
   Initialize: Generate an initial population, evaluate the individuals and assign a quality value to them;
   while Stopping conditions are not satisfied do
       Evolve a new population using stochastic search operators.
       Evaluate all individuals in the population and assign a quality value to them.
       Select the subset of individuals, Ωil, that should undergo the individual improvement procedure.
       for each individual in Ωil do
           Perform individual learning using meme(s) with frequency or probability of fil, with an intensity of til.
           Proceed with Lamarckian or Baldwinian learning.
       end for
   end while

Lamarckian learning in this context means to update the chromosome according to the improved solution found by the individual learning step, while Baldwinian learning leaves the chromosome unchanged and uses only the improved fitness. This pseudo code leaves open which steps are based on the fitness of the individuals and which are not. In question are the evolving of the new population and the selection of $\Omega_{il}$.

Since most MA implementations are based on EAs, the pseudo code of a corresponding representative of the first generation is also given here, following Krasnogor:

Pseudo code

   Procedure Memetic Algorithm Based on an EA
   Initialization: t=0;  // Initialization of the generation counter
                   Randomly generate an initial population P(t);
                   Compute the fitness f(p)  ∀p∈P(t);
   while Stopping conditions are not satisfied do
       Selection:  Accordingly to f(p) choose a subset of P(t) and store it in M(t);
       Offspring: Recombine and mutate individuals p∈M(t) and store them in M′(t);
       Learning: Improve p′ by local search or heuristic ∀p′∈M′(t);
       Evaluation: Compute the fitness f(p′)  ∀p′∈M′(t);
       if Lamarckian learning then
          Update chromosome of p′ according to improvement ∀p′∈M′(t);
       fi
       New generation: Generate P(t+1) by selecting some individuals from P(t) and M′(t);
       t=t+1;  // Increment the generation counter
   end while
   Return best individual p∈P(t−1) as result;

There are some alternatives for this MA scheme. For example:

- All or some of the initial individuals may be improved by the meme(s).
- The parents may be locally improved instead of the offspring.
- Instead of all offspring, only a randomly selected or fitness-dependent fraction may undergo local improvement. The latter requires the evaluation of the offspring in $M'(t)$ prior to the Learning step.

=== 2nd generation ===
Multi-meme, hyper-heuristic and meta-Lamarckian MA are referred to as second generation MA exhibiting the principles of memetic transmission and selection in their design. In Multi-meme MA, the memetic material is encoded as part of the genotype. Subsequently, the decoded meme of each respective individual/chromosome is then used to perform a local refinement. The memetic material is then transmitted through a simple inheritance mechanism from parent to offspring(s). On the other hand, in hyper-heuristic and meta-Lamarckian MA, the pool of candidate memes considered will compete, based on their past merits in generating local improvements through a reward mechanism, deciding on which meme to be selected to proceed for future local refinements. Memes with a higher reward have a greater chance of continuing to be used. For a review on second generation MA; i.e., MA considering multiple individual learning methods within an evolutionary system, the reader is referred to.

=== 3rd generation ===
Co-evolution and self-generating MAs may be regarded as 3rd generation MA where all three principles satisfying the definitions of a basic evolving system have been considered. In contrast to 2nd generation MA which assumes that the memes to be used are known a priori, 3rd generation MA utilizes a rule-based local search to supplement candidate solutions within the evolutionary system, thus capturing regularly repeated features or patterns in the problem space.

== Some design notes ==
The learning method/meme used has a significant impact on the improvement results, so care must be taken in deciding which meme or memes to use for a particular optimization problem. The frequency and intensity of individual learning directly define the degree of evolution (exploration) against individual learning (exploitation) in the MA search, for a given fixed limited computational budget. Clearly, a more intense individual learning provides greater chance of convergence to the local optima but limits the amount of evolution that may be expended without incurring excessive computational resources. Therefore, care should be taken when setting these two parameters to balance the computational budget available in achieving maximum search performance. When only a portion of the population individuals undergo learning, the issue of which subset of individuals to improve need to be considered to maximize the utility of MA search. Last but not least, it has to be decided whether the respective individual should be changed by the learning success (Lamarckian learning) or not (Baldwinian learning). Thus, the following five design questions must be answered, the first of which is addressed by all of the above 2nd generation representatives during an MA run, while the extended form of meta-Lamarckian learning of expands this to the first four design decisions.

=== Selection of an individual learning method or meme to be used for a particular problem or individual ===
In the context of continuous optimization, individual learning exists in the form of local heuristics or conventional exact enumerative methods. Examples of individual learning strategies include the hill climbing, Simplex method, Newton/Quasi-Newton method, interior point methods, conjugate gradient method, line search, and other local heuristics. Note that most of the common individual learning methods are deterministic.

In combinatorial optimization, on the other hand, individual learning methods commonly exist in the form of heuristics (which can be deterministic or stochastic) that are tailored to a specific problem of interest. Typical heuristic procedures and schemes include the k-gene exchange, edge exchange, first-improvement, and many others.

=== Determination of the individual learning frequency ===
One of the first issues pertinent to memetic algorithm design is to consider how often the individual learning should be applied; i.e., individual learning frequency. In one case, the effect of individual learning frequency on MA search performance was considered where various configurations of the individual learning frequency at different stages of the MA search were investigated. Conversely, it was shown elsewhere that it may be worthwhile to apply individual learning on every individual if the computational complexity of the individual learning is relatively low.

=== Selection of the individuals to which individual learning is applied ===
On the issue of selecting appropriate individuals among the EA population that should undergo individual learning, fitness-based and distribution-based strategies were studied for adapting the probability of applying individual learning on the population of chromosomes in continuous parametric search problems with Land extending the work to combinatorial optimization problems. Bambha et al. introduced a simulated heating technique for systematically integrating parameterized individual learning into evolutionary algorithms to achieve maximum solution quality.

=== Specification of the intensity of individual learning ===
Individual learning intensity, $t_{il}$, is the amount of computational budget allocated to an iteration of individual learning; i.e., the maximum computational budget allowable for individual learning to expend on improving a single solution.

=== Choice of Lamarckian or Baldwinian learning ===
It is to be decided whether a found improvement is to work only by the better fitness (Baldwinian learning) or whether also the individual is adapted accordingly (lamarckian learning). In the case of an EA, this would mean an adjustment of the genotype. This question has been controversially discussed for EAs in the literature already in the 1990s, stating that the specific use case plays a major role. The background of the debate is that genome adaptation may promote premature convergence. This risk can be effectively mitigated by other measures to better balance breadth and depth searches, such as the use of structured populations.

== Applications ==
Memetic algorithms have been successfully applied to a multitude of real-world problems. Although many people employ techniques closely related to memetic algorithms, alternative names such as hybrid genetic algorithms are also employed.

Researchers have used memetic algorithms to tackle many classical NP problems. To cite some of them: graph partitioning, multidimensional knapsack, travelling salesman problem, quadratic assignment problem, set cover problem, minimal graph coloring, max independent set problem, bin packing problem, and generalized assignment problem.

More recent applications include (but are not limited to) business analytics and data science, training of artificial neural networks, pattern recognition, robotic motion planning, beam orientation, circuit design, electric service restoration, medical expert systems, single machine scheduling, automatic timetabling (notably, the timetable for the NHL), manpower scheduling, nurse rostering optimisation, processor allocation, maintenance scheduling (for example, of an electric distribution network), scheduling of multiple workflows to constrained heterogeneous resources, multidimensional knapsack problem, VLSI design, clustering of gene expression profiles, feature/gene selection and multi-class, multi-objective feature selection.

== Recent activities in memetic algorithms ==
- IEEE Workshop on Memetic Algorithms (WOMA 2009). Program Chairs: Jim Smith, University of the West of England, U.K.; Yew-Soon Ong, Nanyang Technological University, Singapore; Gustafson Steven, University of Nottingham; U.K.; Meng Hiot Lim, Nanyang Technological University, Singapore; Natalio Krasnogor, University of Nottingham, U.K.
- Memetic Computing Journal, first issue appeared in January 2009.
- 2008 IEEE World Congress on Computational Intelligence (WCCI 2008), Hong Kong, Special Session on Memetic Algorithms.
- Special Issue on 'Emerging Trends in Soft Computing - Memetic Algorithm', Soft Computing Journal, Completed & In Press, 2008.
- IEEE Computational Intelligence Society Emergent Technologies Task Force on Memetic Computing
- IEEE Congress on Evolutionary Computation (CEC 2007), Singapore, Special Session on Memetic Algorithms.
- 'Memetic Computing' by Thomson Scientific's Essential Science Indicators as an Emerging Front Research Area.
- Special Issue on Memetic Algorithms, IEEE Transactions on Systems, Man, and Cybernetics - Part B: Cybernetics, Vol. 37, No. 1, February 2007.
- Recent Advances in Memetic Algorithms, Series: Studies in Fuzziness and Soft Computing, Vol. 166, ISBN 978-3-540-22904-9, 2005.
- Special Issue on Memetic Algorithms, Evolutionary Computation Fall 2004, Vol. 12, No. 3: v-vi.
