= Fred W. Glover =

American computer scientist

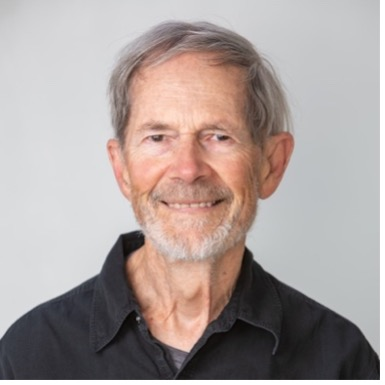
- Born: March 8, 1937 (age 89); Kansas City, Missouri
- Education: Carnegie Mellon University; University of Missouri, Kansas City
- Known for: Innovations in Mathematical Optimization; Quantum bridge analytics
- Awards: John von Neumann Theory Prize (1998); INFORMS Fellow (2002); U.S. National Academy of Engineering (2002); Honorary Doctorate, Glushkov Institute of Cybernetics, NAS of Ukraine (2006); INFORMS Impact Prize (2010); IEEE Fellow (2013); Honorary Doctorate, Universiade de Burgos, Spain (2024); Leader in Mathematics Award (2026)
- Scientific career
- Workplaces: Entanglement, Inc., New York; University of Colorado, Boulder

Fred Glover is Chief Scientific Officer of Entanglement, Inc., USA, in charge of algorithmic design and strategic planning for applications of combinatorial optimization in quantum computing. He also holds the title of Distinguished University Professor, Emeritus, at the University of Colorado, Boulder, associated with the College of Engineering and Applied Science and the Leeds School of Business. He is known for his innovations in the area of metaheuristics including the computer-based optimization methodology of Tabu search an adaptive memory programming algorithm for mathematical optimization, and the associated evolutionary Scatter Search and Path Relinking algorithms.

His past and present editorial positions include serving as first Editor-in-Chief and co-founder of the Journal of Heuristics, Area Editor INFORMS Journal on Computing, Area Editor Mathematics of Industrial Systems, Area Editor Annals of Operations Research, Associate Editor Management Science, Associate Editor Operations Research, Honorary Editor International Journal of Applied Metaheuristic Computing, and Special Issue Editor European Journal of Operational Research.

He has authored and coauthored over 540 research publications spanning the fields of network optimization artificial intelligence discrete optimization, simulation optimization, and quantum-inspired computing, and co-founded the companies Analysis, Research and Computation, Inc. (now within Science Applications International, Inc.), Heuristec, Inc. (now within Tomax, Inc.) and OptTek Systems, Inc.

== Education ==
Glover received his PhD in operations research in 1965 under Gerald L. Thompson and Herbert A. Simon from Carnegie Mellon University, and served as a Post-doctoral Research Fellow with the Miller Institute at the University of California, Berkeley, in the Industrial Engineering & Operations Research Department headed by George B. Dantzig in 1967. He obtained a Bachelor of Business Administration from the University of Missouri in 1960.

== Honors and awards ==
Dr. Glover is an elected member of the U.S. National Academy of Engineering and is the recipient of the John von Neumann Theory Prize, the highest honor of the Institute for Operations Research and the Management Sciences. His other awards and honorary fellowships include:

- Fellow, Asia-Pacific Artificial Intelligence Association (AAIA) (2024)
- Fellow, International Academy of Information Technology and Quantitative Management (IAITQM) (2022)
- IEEE Life Fellow for individuals who have distinguished themselves through sustained and lasting contributions to IEEE.
- The INFORMS Journal on Computing Test of Time Award (2007, 2022)
- The Omega International Journal of Management Science Best Paper Award (2017)
- Honorary Doctorate, Universidad de Burgos, Spain (2024)
- Mathematics in United States Leader Award (2023,2024,2025,2026)
- Fellow, Institute of Electrical and Electronics Engineers(IEEE) (2013)
- Herbert A. Simon Award for Outstanding Contribution in Information Technology and Decision Making, by the International Academy of Information Technology and Quantitative Management (2013)
- Highest CU Mathematics ranking in World's Best Scientists (2025)
- INFORMS Impact Prize for contributions that have had a broad and enduring impact on the fields of Operations Research and Management Science (2010)
- Networks Journal Honor: creation of the Glover-Klingman Prize given annually for best paper to appear in the Networks journal (2003)
- Fellow, Institute of Operations Research and Management Science (INFORMS) (2002)
- Outstanding Achievement Award of the Decision Sciences Institute (1988)
- Honorary Fellow, Alpha Iota Delta International Honor Society in Decision Sciences and Information Systems (1983)
- Honorary Fellow, American Association for the Advancement of Science (AAAS)(1983)
- Federal Fellow, U.S. Defense Information Systems Agency (DISA)(1972)

== Honorary Appointments & Professorships ==
- The Siwei Cheng Award, by the International Academy of Information Technology and Quantitative Management (2016)
- Honorary Director, Institute of Management Science & Industrial Engineering, China University of Mining and Technology (2013)
- Chaired Research Professor in Computer Science (Chaire d’excellence, Pays de la Loire), Laboratoire d'Etude et de Recherche en Informatique d'Angers (LERIA) (2009)
- Honorary Doctorate, Glushkov Institute of Cybernetics, National Academy of Sciences of Ukraine (2006)
- Honorary Professor, Department of Mathematics and Statistical Sciences, University of Colorado, Denver, (2001)
- Founding Research Director of the Hearin Center for Enterprise Science at the University of Mississippi in Oxford, Mississippi (1999)
- Distinguished Visiting Researcher, Université Sorbonne Paris-Nord (1998)
- Distinguished Visiting Research Professor, École Polytechnique Federale de Lausanne (Swiss Federal Institute of Technology), Switzerland, (1989-1990; 2001-2002)
- Director of Research, Center for Applied Artificial Intelligence (founding member), University of Colorado (1984-1990)
- Research Scholar, Centre National de la Recherche Scientifique (CNRS), Universite de Grenoble, France (1991)
- Visiting Cockrell Family Regents Chaired Professor in Engineering, University of Texas at Austin, (1988-1989)
- Distinguished University Research Lecturer, University of British Columbia (1994)
- Head of Global Optimization, NASA Center for Space Construction (now within Aerospace Engineering Sciences), University of Colorado, Boulder (1991)
