= Rider optimization algorithm =

Rider Optimization Algorithm (ROA)
- Developed by: Binu D
- Category: Metaheuristics
- Year of development: 2019
- Publisher: IEEE
- Language: Matlab
- Citation count: 49

The rider optimization algorithm (ROA) is devised based on a novel computing method, namely fictional computing that undergoes series of process to solve the issues of optimizations using imaginary facts and notions. ROA relies on the groups of rider that struggle to reach the target. ROA employs rider groups that take a trip to reach common target in order to become winner. In ROA, the count of groups is four wherein equal riders are placed.

The four groups adapted in ROA are attacker, overtaker, follower, and bypass rider. Each group undergoes series of strategy to attain the target. The goal of bypass rider is to attain target by bypassing leader's path. The follower tries to follow the position of leader in axis. Furthermore, the follower employs multidirectional search space considering leading rider, which is useful for algorithm as it improves convergence rate. The overtaker undergoes its own position to attain target considering nearby locations of leader. The benefit of overtaker is that it facilitates faster convergence with huge global neighbourhood. As per ROA, the global optimal convergence is function of overtaker, whose position relies on the position of the leader, success rate, and directional indicator. The attacker adapts position of leader to accomplish destination by using its utmost speed. Moreover, it is responsible for initializing the multidirectional search using fast search for accelerating search speed.

Despite the riders undergoes a specific method, the major factors employed for reaching the target are correct riding of vehicles and proper management of accelerator, steering, brake and gear. At each time instance, the riders alter its position towards target by regulating these factors and follow the prescribed method using current success rate. The leader is defined using the success rate at current instance. The process is repeated till the riders go into off time that is maximal instant provided to riders to attain intended location. After reaching off time, the rider at leading position is termed winner.

== Algorithm ==
The ROA is motivated from riders, who contend to reach anticipated location. The steps employed in ROA algorithm are defined below:

=== Initialization of Rider and other algorithmic parameters ===
The foremost step is the initialization of algorithm which is done using four groups of riders represented as $V$, and initializations of its positions are performed in arbitrary manner. The initialization of group is given by,

$S_l=\{S_l(v,k)\};1\leq v \leq P , 1\leq k \leq W$	1

where, $P$ signifies count of riders, and $S_l(v,k)$signifies position of $v^{th}$ rider in $k^{th}$ size at $l^{th}$ time instant.

The count of riders is evaluated with count of riders of each group and is expressed as,

$P=B+J+O+A+K$	2

where, $B$ signifies bypass rider, $J$ represent follower, $O$ signifies overtaker, $A$ represent attacker, and $K$ signifies rag bull rider. Hence, the relation amongst the aforementioned attributes is represented as,

$B+J+O+A+K=\frac{P}{5}$	3

=== Finding rate of success ===
After rider group parameters initialization, the rate of success considering each rider is evaluated. The rate of success is computed with distance and is measured between rider location and target and is formulated as,

$Success rate=\frac{1}{\|S_v-l_t\|}$	4

where,$S_v$ symbolize position of $v^{th}$ rider and $l_t$ indicate target position. To elevate rate of success, distance must be minimized and hence, distance reciprocal offers the success rate of rider.

=== Determination of leading rider ===
The rate of success is employed as significant part in discovering leader. The rider that reside in near target location is supposed to contain highest rate of success.

=== Evaluate the rider’s update position ===
The position of rider in each group is updated to discover rider at leading position and hence is winner. Thus, the rider update the position using the features of each rider defined on the definition. The update position of each rider is explained below:

The follower has an inclination to update position based on location of leading rider to attain target in quick manner and is expressed as,

$S_{l+1}^f(v,o)=S^G(G,o)+[cos(\varphi_{v,o}^l*S^G(G,o)*\partial_v^l)]$	5

where, $o$ signifies coordinate selector, $S^G$ represent leading rider position, $G$ indicate leader's index, $\varphi_{v,o}^l$signifies angle of steering considering $v^{th}$ rider in $o^{th}$coordinate, and $\partial_v^l$ represent distance.

The overtaker's update position is utilized to elevate rate of success by discovering overtaker position and is represented as,

$S_{l+1}^o(v,o)=S_l(v,o)+[D_l^*\bigl(v\bigr)*S^G(G,o)]$	6

where, $D_l^*\bigl(v\bigr)$signifies direction indicator.

The attacker contains an inclination to confiscate the leaders position by following the leader's update process and is expressed as,

$S_{l+1}^a(v,\rho)=S^G(G,\rho)+[cos\varphi_{v,\rho}^l*S^G(G,\rho)]+\partial_v^l$	7

Here, the update rule of bypass riders is exhibited wherein standard bypass rider is expressed as,

$S_{l+1}^b(v,\rho)=\lambda[S_l(\chi,\rho)*\delta(\rho)+S_l(\xi,\rho)*[1-\delta(\rho)]]$	8

where, $\lambda$ signifies random number, $\chi$ symbolize random number between 1 and $P$ , $\xi$ indicate a random number ranging between 1 and $P$ and $\delta$ represent random number between 0 and 1.

=== Finding success rate ===
After executing process of update, the rate of success considering each rider is computed.

=== Update of Rider parameter ===
The parameter of rider's update is important to discover an effective solution. Moreover, the steering angle, gears are updated with activity counter, and are updated with success rate.

=== Off time of rider ===
The procedure is iterated repeatedly till $L_{OFF}$ wherein, leader is discovered. After race completion, the leading rider is considered as winner.

algorithm rider-optimization is
    input: Arbitrary rider position 
  
    
      
        
          S
          
            l
          
        
      
    
    {\displaystyle S_{l}}
  
,
           iteration 
  
    
      
        l
      
    
    {\displaystyle l}
  
,
           maximum iteration 
  
    
      
        L
      
    
    {\displaystyle L}
  

    output: Leading rider 
  
    
      
        
          S
          
            G
          
        
      
    
    {\displaystyle S^{G}}
  


    Initialize solution set
    Initialize other parameter of rider.
    Find rate of success using equation (4)

    while 
  
    
      
        l
        <
        
          L
          
            O
            F
            F
          
        
      
    
    {\displaystyle l<L_{OFF}}
  

        for 
  
    
      
        v
        =
        1
        t
        o
        P
      
    
    {\displaystyle v=1toP}
  

            Update position of follower using equation (5)
            Update position of overtaker with equation (6)
            Update position of attacker with equation (7)
            Update position of bypass rider with equation (8)
            Rank the riders based on success rate using equation (4)
            Select the rider with  high success rate
            Update rider parameters
            Return 
  
    
      
        
          S
          
            G
          
        
      
    
    {\displaystyle S^{G}}
  

            
  
    
      
        l
        =
        l
        +
        1
      
    
    {\displaystyle l=l+1}
  

== Applications ==
The applications of ROA are noticed in several domains that involve: Engineering Design Optimization Problems, Diabetic retinopathy detection, Document clustering, Plant disease detection, Attack Detection, Enhanced Video Super Resolution, Clustering, Webpages Re-ranking, Task scheduling, Medical Image Compression, Resource allocation, and multihop routing
