= Metaheuristic =

Optimization technique

In computer science and mathematical optimization, a metaheuristic is a higher-level procedure or heuristic designed to find, generate, tune, or select a heuristic (partial search algorithm) that may provide a sufficiently good solution to an optimization problem or a machine learning problem, especially with incomplete or imperfect information or limited computation capacity. Metaheuristics sample a subset of solutions which is otherwise too large to be completely enumerated or otherwise explored. Metaheuristics may make relatively few assumptions about the optimization problem being solved and so may be usable for a variety of problems. Their use is always of interest when exact or other (approximate) methods are not available or are not expedient, either because the calculation time is too long or because, for example, the solution provided is too imprecise.

Compared to optimization algorithms and iterative methods, metaheuristics do not guarantee that a globally optimal solution can be found on some class of problems. Many metaheuristics implement some form of stochastic optimization, so that the solution found is dependent on the set of random variables generated. In combinatorial optimization, there are many problems that belong to the class of NP-complete problems and thus can no longer be solved exactly in an acceptable time from a relatively low degree of complexity. Metaheuristics then often provide good solutions with less computational effort than approximation methods, iterative methods, or simple heuristics. This also applies in the field of continuous or mixed-integer optimization. As such, metaheuristics are useful approaches for optimization problems. Several books and survey papers have been published on the subject. Literature review on metaheuristic optimization, suggested that it was Fred Glover who coined the word metaheuristics.

Most literature on metaheuristics is experimental in nature, describing empirical results based on computer experiments with the algorithms. But some formal theoretical results are also available, often on convergence and the possibility of finding the global optimum. Also worth mentioning are the no-free-lunch theorems, which state that there can be no metaheuristic that is better than all others for any given problem.

Especially since the turn of the millennium, many metaheuristic methods have been published with claims of novelty and practical efficacy. While the field also features high-quality research, many of the more recent publications have been of poor quality; flaws include vagueness, lack of conceptual elaboration, poor experiments, and ignorance of previous literature.

== Properties ==
These are properties that characterize most metaheuristics:

- Metaheuristics are strategies that guide the search process.
- The goal is to efficiently explore the search space in order to find optimal or near–optimal solutions.
- Techniques which constitute metaheuristic algorithms range from simple local search procedures to complex learning processes.
- Metaheuristic algorithms are approximate and usually non-deterministic.
- Metaheuristics are not problem-specific. However, they were often developed in relation to a problem class such as continuous or combinatorial optimization and then generalized later in some cases.
- They can draw on domain-specific knowledge in the form of heuristics that are controlled by a higher-level strategy of the metaheuristic.
- They can contain mechanisms that prevent them from getting stuck in certain areas of the search space.
- Modern metaheuristics often use the search history to control the search.

== Classification ==
Euler diagram of the different classifications of metaheuristics

There are a wide variety of metaheuristics and a number of properties with respect to which to classify them. The following list is therefore to be understood as an example.

=== Local search vs. global search ===
One approach is to characterize the type of search strategy. One type of search strategy is an improvement on simple local search algorithms. A well known local search algorithm is the hill climbing method which is used to find local optimums. However, hill climbing does not guarantee finding global optimum solutions.

Many metaheuristic ideas were proposed to improve local search heuristic in order to find better solutions. Such metaheuristics include simulated annealing, tabu search, iterated local search, variable neighborhood search, and GRASP. These metaheuristics can both be classified as local search-based or global search metaheuristics.

Other global search metaheuristic that are not local search-based are usually population-based metaheuristics. Such metaheuristics include ant colony optimization, evolutionary computation such as genetic algorithm or evolution strategies, particle swarm optimization, rider optimization algorithm and bacterial foraging algorithm.

=== Single-solution vs. population-based ===
Another classification dimension is single solution vs population-based searches. Single solution approaches focus on modifying and improving a single candidate solution; single solution metaheuristics include simulated annealing, iterated local search, variable neighborhood search, and guided local search. Population-based approaches maintain and improve multiple candidate solutions, often using population characteristics to guide the search; population based metaheuristics include evolutionary computation and particle swarm optimization. Another category of metaheuristics is Swarm intelligence which is a collective behavior of decentralized, self-organized agents in a population or swarm. Ant colony optimization, particle swarm optimization, social cognitive optimization, bacterial foraging algorithm, and Grey Wolf Optimization are examples of this category.

=== Hybridization and memetic algorithms ===
A hybrid metaheuristic is one that combines a metaheuristic with other optimization approaches, such as algorithms from mathematical programming, constraint programming, and machine learning. Both components of a hybrid metaheuristic may run concurrently and exchange information to guide the search.

On the other hand, Memetic algorithms represent the synergy of evolutionary or any population-based approach with separate individual learning or local improvement procedures for problem search. An example of memetic algorithm is the use of a local search algorithm instead of or in addition to a basic mutation operator in evolutionary algorithms.

=== Parallel metaheuristics ===
A parallel metaheuristic is one that uses the techniques of parallel programming to run multiple metaheuristic searches in parallel; these may range from simple distributed schemes to concurrent search runs that interact to improve the overall solution.

With population-based metaheuristics, the population itself can be parallelized by either processing each individual or group with a separate thread or the metaheuristic itself runs on one computer and the offspring are evaluated in a distributed manner per iteration. The latter is particularly useful if the computational effort for the evaluation is considerably greater than that for the generation of descendants. This is the case in many practical applications, especially in simulation-based calculations of solution quality.

=== Nature-inspired and metaphor-based metaheuristics ===
A very active area of research is the design of nature-inspired metaheuristics. Many recent metaheuristics, especially evolutionary computation-based algorithms, are inspired by natural systems. Nature acts as a source of concepts, mechanisms and principles for designing of artificial computing systems to deal with complex computational problems. Such metaheuristics include simulated annealing, evolutionary algorithms, ant colony optimization and particle swarm optimization.

A large number of more recent metaphor-inspired metaheuristics have started to attract criticism in the research community for hiding their lack of novelty behind an elaborate metaphor. As a result, a number of renowned scientists of the field have proposed a research agenda for the standardization of metaheuristics in order to make them more comparable, among other things. Another consequence is that the publication guidelines of a number of scientific journals have been adapted accordingly. A comprehensive - though by no means complete - overview of these dubious algorithms can be found in the Evolutionary Computation Bestiary.

== Applications ==
Most metaheuristics are search methods and when using them, the evaluation function should be subject to greater demands than a mathematical optimization. Not only does the desired target state have to be formulated, but the evaluation should also reward improvements to a solution on the way to the target in order to support and accelerate the search process. The fitness functions of evolutionary or memetic algorithms can serve as an example.

Metaheuristics are used for all types of optimization problems, ranging from continuous through mixed integer problems to combinatorial optimization or combinations thereof. In combinatorial optimization, an optimal solution is sought over a discrete search-space. An example problem is the travelling salesman problem where the search-space of candidate solutions grows faster than exponentially as the size of the problem increases, which makes an exhaustive search for the optimal solution infeasible. Additionally, multidimensional combinatorial problems, including most design problems in engineering such as form-finding and behavior-finding, suffer from the curse of dimensionality, which also makes them infeasible for exhaustive search or analytical methods.

Metaheuristics are also frequently applied to scheduling problems. A typical representative of this combinatorial task class is job shop scheduling, which involves assigning the work steps of jobs to processing stations in such a way that all jobs are completed on time and altogether in the shortest possible time. In practice, restrictions often have to be observed, e.g. by limiting the permissible sequence of work steps of a job through predefined workflows and/or with regard to resource utilisation, e.g. in the form of smoothing the energy demand. Popular metaheuristics for combinatorial problems include genetic algorithms by Holland et al., scatter search and tabu search by Glover.

Another large field of application are optimization tasks in continuous or mixed-integer search spaces. This includes, e.g., design optimization or various engineering tasks. An example of the mixture of combinatorial and continuous optimization is the planning of favourable motion paths for industrial robots.

== Metaheuristic Optimization Frameworks ==
A MOF can be defined as a set of software tools that provide a correct and reusable implementation of a set of metaheuristics, and the basic mechanisms to accelerate the implementation of its partner subordinate heuristics (possibly including solution encodings and technique-specific operators), which are necessary to solve a particular problem instance using techniques provided.

There are many candidate optimization tools which can be considered as a MOF of varying feature. The following list of 33 MOFs is compared and evaluated in detail in: Comet, EvA2, evolvica, Evolutionary::Algorithm, GAPlayground, jaga, JCLEC, JGAP, jMetal, n-genes, Open Beagle, Opt4j, ParadisEO/EO, Pisa, Watchmaker, FOM, Hypercube, HotFrame, Templar, EasyLocal, iOpt, OptQuest, JDEAL, Optimization Algorithm Toolkit, HeuristicLab, MAFRA, Localizer, GALIB, DREAM, Discropt, MALLBA, MAGMA, and UOF. There have been a number of publications on the support of parallel implementations, which was missing in this comparative study, particularly from the late 10s onwards.

== Contributions ==
Many different metaheuristics are in existence and new variants are continually being proposed. Some of the most significant contributions to the field are:

- 1952: Robbins and Monro work on stochastic optimization methods.
- 1954: Barricelli carries out the first simulations of the evolution process and uses them on general optimization problems.
- 1963: Rastrigin proposes random search.
- 1965: Matyas proposes random optimization.
- 1965: Nelder and Mead propose a simplex heuristic, which was shown by Powell to converge to non-stationary points on some problems.
- 1965: Ingo Rechenberg discovers the first Evolution Strategies algorithm.
- 1966: Fogel et al. propose evolutionary programming.
- 1970: Hastings proposes the Metropolis–Hastings algorithm.
- 1970: Cavicchio proposes adaptation of control parameters for an optimizer.
- 1970: Kernighan and Lin propose a graph partitioning method, related to variable-depth search and prohibition-based (tabu) search.
- 1975: Holland proposes the genetic algorithm.
- 1977: Glover proposes scatter search.
- 1978: Mercer and Sampson propose a metaplan for tuning an optimizer's parameters by using another optimizer.
- 1980: Smith describes genetic programming.
- 1983: Kirkpatrick et al. propose simulated annealing.
- 1986: Glover proposes tabu search, first mention of the term metaheuristic.
- 1989: Moscato proposes memetic algorithms.
- 1990: Moscato and Fontanari, and Dueck and Scheuer, independently proposed a deterministic update rule for simulated annealing which accelerated the search. This led to the threshold accepting metaheuristic.
- 1992: Dorigo introduces ant colony optimization in his PhD thesis.
- 1995: Wolpert and Macready prove the no free lunch theorems.

== See also ==
- Stochastic search
- Meta-optimization
- Matheuristics
- Hyper-heuristics
- Swarm intelligence
- Evolutionary algorithms and in particular genetic algorithms, genetic programming, or evolution strategies.
- Simulated annealing
- Workforce modeling
