= Dirk Kroese =

Dutch-Australian mathematician and statistician

Dirk P. Kroese
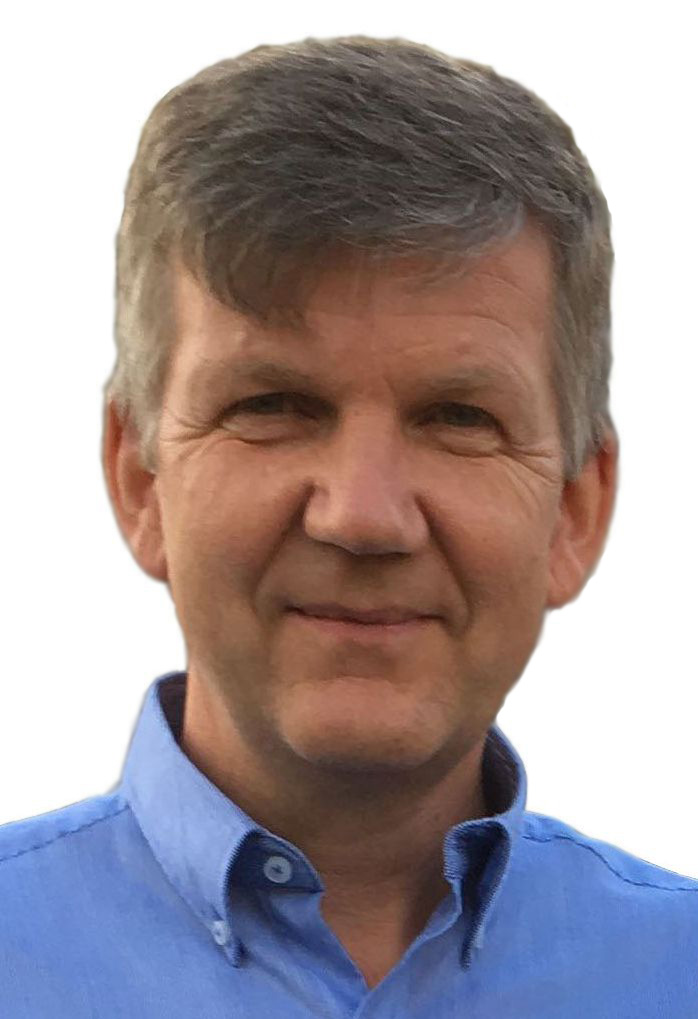
- Born: 1963 (age 62–63); Wapenveld, the Netherlands
- Scientific career
- Fields: Mathematics AND Statistics
- Workplaces: The University of Queensland
- Thesis: Stochastic Models in Reliability (1990)

Dirk Pieter Kroese (born 1963) is a Dutch-Australian mathematician and statistician, and Emeritus Professor at the University of Queensland. He is known for several significant contributions to applied probability, kernel density estimation, Monte Carlo methods and rare-event simulation. He is, with Reuven Rubinstein, a pioneer of the Cross-Entropy (CE) method.

== Biography ==
Born in Wapenveld (municipality of Heerde), Dirk Kroese received his MSc (Netherlands Ingenieur (ir) degree) in 1986 and his Ph.D. (cum laude) in 1990, both from the Department of Applied Mathematics at the University of Twente. His dissertation was entitled Stochastic Models in Reliability. His PhD advisors were Joseph H. A. de Smit and Wilbert C. M. Kallenberg. Part of his PhD research was carried out at Princeton University under the guidance of Erhan Çınlar. He has held teaching and research positions at University of Texas at Austin (1986), Princeton University (1988–1989), the University of Twente (1991–1998), the University of Melbourne (1997), and the University of Adelaide (1998–2000). Since 2000 he has been working at the University of Queensland, where he became a full professor in 2010.

== Work ==
Kroese's work spans a wide range of topics in applied probability and mathematical statistics, including telecommunication networks, reliability engineering, point processes, kernel density estimation, Monte Carlo methods, rare-event simulation, cross-entropy methods, randomized optimization, and machine learning. He is a Chief Investigator of the Australian Research Council Centre of Excellence in Mathematical and Statistical Frontiers (ACEMS). He has over 140 peer-reviewed publications, including 10 books.

== Publications ==
=== Books ===
- Rubinstein, R.Y., Kroese, D.P. (2004). The Cross-Entropy Method: A Unified Approach to Combinatorial Optimization, Monte-Carlo Simulation, and Machine Learning, Springer, New York.
- Rubinstein, R. Y., Kroese, D. P. (2007). Simulation and the Monte Carlo Method, 2nd edition, John Wiley & Sons.
- Kroese, D.P., Taimre, T., and Botev, Z.I. (2011). Handbook of Monte Carlo Methods, Wiley Series in Probability and Statistics, John Wiley & Sons, New York.
- Kroese, D.P. and Chan, J.C.C. (2014). Statistical Modeling and Computation, Springer, New York.
- Rubinstein, R. Y., Kroese, D. P. (2017). Simulation and the Monte Carlo Method, 3rd edition, John Wiley & Sons.
- Kroese, D.P., Botev, Z.I., Taimre, T and Vaisman, R. (2019). Data Science and Machine Learning: Mathematical and Statistical Methods, Chapman & Hall/CRC.
- Kroese, D.P., Botev, Z.I. (2023). An Advanced Course in Probability and Stochastic Processes, Chapman & Hall/CRC.
- Chan, J.C.C., Kroese, D.P. (2025). Statistical Modeling and Computation, Second Edition, Springer Nature.
- Botev, Z.I., Kroese, D.P, Taimre, T. (2025). Data Science and Machine Learning: Mathematical and Statistical Methods, Second Edition, Chapman & Hall/CRC.

=== Selected articles ===
- de Boer, Kroese, D.P., Mannor, S. and Rubinstein, R.Y. (2005). A tutorial on the cross-entropy method. Annals of Operations Research 134 (1), 19–67.
- Botev, Z.I., Grotowski J.F., Kroese, D.P. (2010). Kernel density estimation via diffusion. The Annals of Statistics 38 (5), 2916–2957.
- Kroese, D.P., Brereton. T., Taimre, T. and Botev Z.I. (2014). Why the Monte Carlo method is so important today. Wiley Interdisciplinary Reviews: Computational Statistics 6 (6), 386–392.
- Kroese, D.P., Porotsky S., Rubinstein, R.Y. (2006). The cross-entropy method for continuous multi-extremal optimization. Methodology and Computing in Applied Probability 8 (3), 383–407.
- Asmussen, S. and Kroese, D.P. Improved algorithms for rare event simulation with heavy tails (2006). Advances in Applied Probability 38 (2), 545–558.
- Botev, Z.I. and Kroese, D.P. (2012). Efficient Monte Carlo simulation via the generalized splitting method. Statistics and Computing 22 (1), 1–16.
