= Roger Mead =

English statistician (1938–2015)

Roger Mead (1938 – 10 August 2015) was an English statistician and Emeritus Professor of Applied Statistics at the University of Reading. He is known for his paper with John Nelder on the widely-used Nelder–Mead method and for his work on statistical methods for agriculture and the design of experiments. He was made an Honorary Life Member of the International Biometric Society in 2014.

== Books ==
- Statistical methods in agriculture and experimental biology (with Robert Curnow). 1983 ISBN 9780412242304
- The design of experiments: statistical principles for practical applications. 1988 ISBN 9780521245128
- Statistical principles for the design of experiments: applications to real experiments (with Steven G. Gilmour and Andrew Mead). 2012 ISBN 0521862140
