= Howard Harry Rosenbrock =

Howard H. Rosenbrock
- Howard H. Rosenbrock
- Born: 16 December 1920; Ilford, London, England
- Died: 21 October 2010 (aged 89)
- Education: University College London, London University
- Awards: Rufus Oldenburger Medal (1994); Moulton Medal
- Scientific career
- Fields: Control theory, optimal control
- Workplaces: University of Manchester Institute of Science and Technology

Howard Harry Rosenbrock (16 December 1920 – 21 October 2010) was a leading figure in control theory and control engineering. He was born in Ilford, England in 1920, graduated in 1941 from University College London with a 1st class honours degree in Electrical Engineering. He served in the Royal Air Force during World War II. He received the PhD from London University in 1955. After some time spent at Cambridge University and MIT, he was awarded a Chair at the University of Manchester Institute of Science and Technology, where he founded the Control Systems Centre. He died on 21 October 2010.

Prof Rosenbrock received many awards including the IEE Premium, the IEE Heaviside Premium, and the IEE Control Achievement Award, the first IEEE Control Systems Science and Engineering Award (1982), the Rufus Oldenburger Medal (1994) and the IChemE Moulton Medal. He was a Fellow of the IEE, the IChemE, the Institute of Measurement and Control, the Royal Academy of Engineering and the Royal Society.

Howard Rosenbrock was a pioneer of multivariable frequency domain control design methods. He also made important contributions to the numerical solution of stiff differential equations and in the development of parameter optimization methods, both known as Rosenbrock methods. The Rosenbrock function is a benchmark test for numerical optimization algorithms.

== See also ==
- Rosenbrock function
- Rosenbrock system matrix
- Rosenbrock methods
