= Reuven Rubinstein =

Israeli operations researcher (1938–2012)

- ראובן רובינשטיין
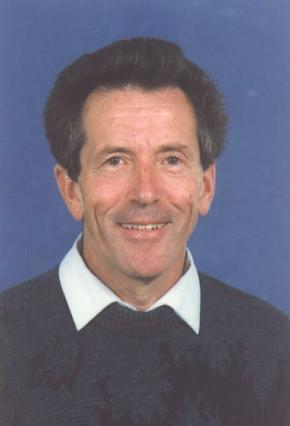
- Born: August 25, 1938; Kaunas, Lithuania
- Died: January 1, 2012 (aged 73)
- Education: Kaunas Polytechnical Institute, Riga Polytechnical Institute
- Known for: Score-function method, Stochastic counterpart method, Cross-entropy method
- Awards: INFORMS Simulation Society's Lifetime Professional Achievement Award (2010), Operations Research Society of Israel's Lifetime Professional Award (2011)
- Scientific career
- Fields: Monte Carlo simulation, Applied probability, Stochastic modeling, Stochastic optimization
- Workplaces: University of Illinois Urbana-Champaign, Columbia University, Harvard University, Stanford University, IBM, Bell Laboratories

Reuven Rubinstein (Hebrew: ראובן רובינשטיין; 1938–2012) was an Israeli scientist known for his contributions to Monte Carlo simulation, applied probability, stochastic modeling, and stochastic optimization, having authored more than one hundred papers and six books.

During his career, Rubinstein made fundamental and important contributions in these fields and advanced the theory and application of adaptive importance sampling, rare-event simulation, stochastic optimization, sensitivity analysis of simulation-based models, the splitting method, and counting problems concerning NP-complete problems.

He is well known as the founder of several breakthrough methods, such as the score-function method, the stochastic counterpart method, and the cross-entropy method, which have numerous applications in combinatorial optimization and simulation.

== Early life and education ==
Rubinstein was born on August 25, 1938, in Kaunas, Lithuania. In 1960, he received a BSc (unknown subject) and MSc (Electrical Engineering) from the Kaunas Polytechnical Institute. In 1969, he received a DSc in Operations Research from the Riga Polytechnical Institute.

== Career and awards ==
His citation index is in the top 5% among his colleagues in operations research and management sciences. His 1981 book "Simulation and the Monte Carlo Method", Wiley (second edition 2008 and third edition 2017, with Dirk Kroese) alone has over 10,000 citations. He has held visiting positions in various research institutes, including the University of Illinois Urbana-Champaign, Columbia University, Harvard University, Stanford University, IBM, and Bell Laboratories. He has given invited and plenary lectures in many international conferences around the globe.

In 2010 Prof. Rubinstein won the INFORMS Simulation Society's highest prize—the Lifetime Professional Achievement Award (LPAA), which recognizes scholars who have made fundamental contributions to the field of simulation that persist over most of a professional career.

In 2011 Reuven Rubinstein won from the Operations Research Society of Israel (ORSIS) the Lifetime Professional Award (LPA), which recognizes scholars who have made fundamental contributions to the field of operations research over most of a professional career and constitutes ORSIS's highest award.

== Publications ==
=== Books ===
- Rubinstein, R.Y., "Simulation and the Monte Carlo Method", Wiley, 1981.
- Rubinstein, R.Y., "Monte Carlo Optimization, Simulation and Sensitivity of Queueing Networks", Wiley, 1986.
- Rubinstein, R.Y., and A. Shapiro, "Discrete Event Systems: Sensitivity Analysis and Stochastic Optimization", Wiley, 1993.
- Melamed, B., and R.Y. Rubinstein, "Modern Simulation and Modeling", Wiley, 1998.
- Rubinstein, R.Y., and D.P. Kroese, "The Cross-Entropy Method: a Unified Approach to Combinatorial Optimization, Monte-Carlo Simulation and Machine Learning", Springer, 2004.
- Rubinstein, R.Y., and D.P. Kroese, "Simulation and the Monte Carlo Method", Second Edition, Wiley, 2008.
- Rubinstein, R.Y., Rider, A., and R. Vaisman, "Fast Sequential Monte Carlo Methods for Counting and Optimization", Wiley, 2014.
- Rubinstein, R.Y., and D.P. Kroese, "Simulation and the Monte Carlo Method", Third Edition, Wiley, 2017.

=== Journal articles ===
- Rubinstein, R.Y., "The cross-entropy method for combinatorial and continuous optimization", Methodology and Computing in Applied Probability, 2, 127–190, 1999.
- Rubinstein R.Y., "Randomized algorithms with splitting: Why the classic randomized algorithms do not work and how to make them work", Methodology and Computing in Applied Probability, 2009. doi:10.1007/s11009-009-9126-6
