= Local search (optimization) =

Method for problem solving in optimization

In computer science, local search (LS) is a numerical, heuristic or metaheuristic method for solving computationally hard optimization problems. Local search can be used on problems that can be formulated as finding a solution that maximizes (or minimizes) a criterion among an objective function (criterion) among a number of candidate solutions. The set of all feasible solutions forms the search space. LS is based on the idea of iteratively moving from one solution to the next within a specific neighborhood of the initial solution in the search space. The definition of that neighborhood relation depends on the definition of the objective function, which is problem specific. This, along with the mechanism used to select a new neighbor at each iteration, are the main features that distinguish different local search algorithms from one another.

The basic principle is to find a better solution starting from a given initial one by making a local change to the current solution to find a better one within the neighborhood currently being considered. The process is repeated until no improvements - or only minor improvements - are achieved within a specified number of consecutive iterations, or until a specified runtime limit or an upper limit on the number of iterations is reached. LS algorithms typically find a local optimum and can in no way guarantee that they will locate the global optimum. They are widely applied to numerous hard computational problems, including problems from computer science (particularly artificial intelligence), mathematics, operations research, engineering, and bioinformatics.

== Formal Definition ==
An instance of an optimization problem is a pair $(S,f)$, where the set $S$ denotes the set of all feasible solutions and the function $f\colon S \rightarrow \mathbb{R}$ assigns a quality value to each solution. The goal of optimization (in the case of a maximization problem) is to find a solution $i \in S$ such that $f(i) \geq f(u) \ \forall u \in S$ holds. Such a solution is also referred to as a global optimum. In contrast, a solution $\widehat{i}$ is called a local optimum if $\exists \epsilon > 0 \ \forall u \in S :\ \parallel u - \widehat{i} \parallel < \epsilon \Rightarrow f(\widehat{i}) \geq f(u)$ holds. Since $\max{f(u)} = -\min{-f(u)}$, a minimization problem can easily be transformed into the maximization problem considered here. Thus, this does not constitute a restriction on the generality of the problem.

== Description ==
Most problems can be formulated in terms of a search space and target in several different ways. For example, for the traveling salesman problem a solution can be a route visiting all cities and the goal is to find the shortest route. But a solution can also be a path, and being a cycle is part of the target.

A local search algorithm starts from a candidate solution and then iteratively moves to a neighboring solution; a neighborhood being the set of all potential solutions that differ from the current solution by the minimal possible extent. This requires a neighborhood relation to be defined on the search space. As an example, the neighborhood of vertex cover is another vertex cover only differing by one node. For Boolean satisfiability, the neighbors of a Boolean assignment are those that have a single variable in an opposite state. The same problem may have multiple distinct neighborhoods defined on it; local optimization with neighborhoods that involve changing up to k components of the solution is often referred to as k-opt.

Typically, every candidate solution has more than one neighbor solution; the choice of which one to select is taken using only information about the solutions in the neighborhood of the current assignment, hence the name local search. When the choice of the neighbor solution is done by taking the one locally maximizing the criterion, i.e.: a greedy search, the metaheuristic takes the name hill climbing. When no improving neighbors are present, local search is stuck at a locally optimal point. This local-optima problem can be cured by using restarts (repeated local search with different initial conditions), randomization, or more complex schemes based on iterations, like iterated local search, on memory, like reactive search optimization, on memory-less stochastic modifications, like simulated annealing.

Local search does not provide a guarantee that any given solution is optimal. The search can terminate after a given time bound or when the best solution found thus far has not improved in a given number of steps. Local search is an anytime algorithm; it can return a valid solution even if it's interrupted at any time after finding the first valid solution. Local search is typically an approximation or incomplete algorithm because the search may stop even if the current best solution found is not optimal. This can happen even if termination happens because the current best solution could not be improved, as the optimal solution can lie far from the neighborhood of the solutions crossed by the algorithm.

Schuurman & Southey propose three measures of effectiveness for local search (depth, mobility, and coverage) for satisfiability problems:

- depth: the cost of the current (best) solution;
- mobility: the ability to rapidly move to different areas of the search space (whilst keeping the cost low);
- coverage: how systematically the search covers the search space, the maximum distance between any unexplored assignment and all visited assignments.

They hypothesize that local search algorithms work well for this class of problems because they quickly move to promising regions and explore the search space at low depths as quickly, broadly, and systematically as possible.

== Examples of local search algorithms ==
Below are some examples of local search algorithms from different fields of application.

- In hill-climbing algorithms, which were developed for numerical optimization problems, the path of the steepest ascent is followed until no further improvement in the quality score is possible. The neighborhood thus consists primarily of all points that are better than the current one. There is a wide variety of different algorithms, which differ mainly in whether they
  - rely solely on the quality function or also require its derivative. In the latter case, they belong to the subgroup of gradient descent methods.
  - whether they can take constraints into account or not,
  - and whether they have a simple structure that allows the next test points to be calculated quickly, or whether the search is more complex and thus more computationally expensive. Examples of less computationally intensive algorithms include the Gauss–Seidel method and the Hooke and Jeeves procedure (pattern search), while the methods of Powell or Rosenbrock, for example, require greater computational effort.
- In the k-opt heuristics for the combinatorial traveling salesman problem, two solutions (in this case, tours) are adjacent if one tour can be constructed from the other by removing $k$ edges and adding $k$ other edges.
- The simplex method developed by Nelder and Mead — which should not be confused with Danzig’s simplex method for linear programming — operates on an $n$-dimensional optimization problem with $n+1$ points that form a simplex in the search space. During the search, the simplex undergoes reflection, contraction, and expansion operations depending on the quality of its vertices, with the goal of contracting the simplex at a (local) optimum. Since the algorithm may, under circumstances, omit smaller valleys, strictly speaking, it does not perform a purely local search. It thus falls between true local search algorithms and global search methods, such as population-based metaheuristics. It is also worth mentioning the variant of M. J. Box's method that takes constraints into account, known as Complex (COnstrained siMPLEX).

Other examples of local search algorithms include

- Simulated annealing (suited for either local or global search)
- Tabu search, which avoids the examination of already visited points in the neighborhood
- Late acceptance hill climbing
- Reactive search optimization (combining machine learning and local search heuristics)
- Luus–Jaakola searches locally using a uniform distribution and an exponentially decreasing search-range.
- Random optimization searches locally using a normal distribution.
- Random search searches locally by sampling a hypersphere surrounding the current position.

An overview of various local search methods, their classification, and how they differ from established metaheuristics can be found at Loones.

== Examples of areas of application ==
Some problems where local search has been applied are:

1. The vertex cover problem, in which a solution is a vertex cover of a graph, and the target is to find a solution with a minimal number of nodes
2. The traveling salesman problem, in which a solution is a cycle containing all nodes of the graph and the target is to minimize the total length of the cycle
3. The vehicle routing problem can be viewed as a variant of the traveling salesman problem, albeit with some restrictions to make it practical for delivery companies
4. The Boolean satisfiability problem, in which a candidate solution is a truth assignment, and the target is to maximize the number of clauses satisfied by the assignment; in this case, the final solution is of use only if it satisfies all clauses
5. Scheduling problems like the high school timetabeling task or the nurse scheduling problem where a solution is an assignment of lecturers or nurses to classes or shifts which satisfies all established constraints
6. The k-medoid clustering problem and other related facility location problems for which local search offers the best known approximation ratios from a worst-case perspective
7. The Hopfield Neural Networks problem involves finding stable configurations in Hopfield network.

== See also ==
Local search is a sub-field of:

- Metaheuristics
- Stochastic optimization
- Optimization

== Bibliography ==
- Battiti, Roberto; Mauro Brunato; Franco Mascia (2008). Reactive Search and Intelligent Optimization. Springer Verlag. ISBN 978-0-387-09623-0. Archived from the original on 2012-03-16.
- Hoos, H.H. and Stutzle, T. (2005). Stochastic Local Search: Foundations and Applications, Morgan Kaufmann, ISBN 978-1-558-60872-6, doi:10.1016/B978-1-55860-872-6.X5016-1.
- Vijay Arya and Naveen Garg and Rohit Khandekar and Adam Meyerson and Kamesh Munagala and Vinayaka Pandit, (2004). Local Search Heuristics for k-Median and Facility Location Problems, SIAM Journal of Computing 33(3), doi:10.1137/S009753970241640.
- Juraj Hromkovič (2004): Algorithmics for Hard Problems: Introduction to Combinatorial Optimization, Randomization, Approximation, and Heuristics, 2nd ed, Berlin, Heidelberg: Springer, ISBN 978-3-642-07909-2.
- Wil Michiels, Emile Aarts, Jan Korst (2006), Theoretical Aspects of Local Search, Berlin, Heidelberg: Springer, ISBN 978-3-540-35853-4, doi:10.1007/978-3-540-35854-1.
