= Crystal structure prediction =

Crystal structure prediction (CSP) is the calculation of the crystal structures of solids from first principles. Reliable methods of predicting the crystal structure of a compound, based only on its composition, has been a goal of the physical sciences since the 1950s. Computational methods employed include simulated annealing, evolutionary algorithms, distributed multipole analysis, random sampling, basin-hopping, data mining, density functional theory and molecular mechanics.

== History ==
The crystal structures of simple ionic solids have long been rationalised in terms of Pauling's rules, first set out in 1929 by Linus Pauling. Different rules exist to rationalize the structure of metals and semiconductors involving the valence electron concentration. Crystal structure prediction is different than rationalization. Most commonly, the term crystal structure prediction refers to a search for the minimum-energy arrangement of the constituent atoms (or, for molecular crystals, of its molecules) in space.

The problem has two facets: combinatorics (the "search phase space", in practice most acute for inorganic crystals), and energetics (or "stability ranking", most acute for molecular organic crystals). For complex non-molecular crystals (where the "search problem" is most acute), major recent advances have been the development of the Martonak version of metadynamics, the Oganov-Glass evolutionary algorithm USPEX, and first principles random search. The latter are capable of solving the global optimization problem with up to around a hundred degrees of freedom, while the approach of metadynamics is to reduce all structural variables to a handful of "slow" collective variables (which often works).

== Molecular crystals ==
Predicting organic crystal structures is important in academic and industrial science, particularly for pharmaceuticals and pigments, where understanding polymorphism is beneficial. The crystal structures of molecular substances, particularly organic compounds, are very hard to predict and rank in order of stability. Intermolecular interactions are relatively weak and non-directional and long range. This results in typical lattice and free energy differences between polymorphs that are often only a few kJ/mol, very rarely exceeding 10 kJ/mol. Crystal structure prediction methods often locate many possible structures within this small energy range. These small energy differences are challenging to predict reliably without excessive computational effort.

Since 2007, significant progress has been made in the CSP of small organic molecules, with several different methods proving effective. The most widely discussed method first ranks the energies of all possible crystal structures using a customised MM force field, and finishes by using a dispersion-corrected DFT step to estimate the lattice energy and stability of each short-listed candidate structure. More recent efforts to predict crystal structures have focused on estimating crystal free energy by including the effects of temperature and entropy in organic crystals using vibrational analysis or molecular dynamics.

=== CSP blind tests ===
Seven CSP blind tests have been organized by the Cambridge Crystallographic Data Centre (CCDC), with the first starting in 1999. The most recent blind test (as of 2025) took place from October 2020 to June 2022 and consisted of a structure generation portion and a structure ranking portion. Participants were provided the 2D structure of seven molecules that did not have a published structure and then asked to predict the crystal structure of these systems.

CSP2010 results for the chosen molecules
Molecule number	Name and composition	Synthesis method	Crystal structure
Molecule (XVI)	2-diazo-3,5-cyclohexadiene-1-one ($\ce{C6H4N2O}$)	Slow evaporation from ethanol	Pbca, orthorhombic (Z′ = 1)
Molecule (XVII)	1-2-dichloro-4,5-dinitrobenzene $\ce{(C6H2Cl2N2O4)}$	Slow evaporation from methanol	P2_{1}/c, monoclinic (Z′ = 1)
Molecule (XVIII)	1-((4-chlorophenyl)sulfonyl)-2-oxo-propylidene diazenium $\ce{(C9H7ClN2O3S)}$	Slow evaporation from ethyl acetate (EtOAc)	Pbca, orthorhombic (Z′ = 1)
Molecular salt (XIX)	1,8-naphthyridinium fumarate $\ce{(C8H7N2,\ C4H4O4)}$	Slow evaporation from methanol	Pca2_{1}, orthorhombic (Z′ = 1)
Molecule (XX)	Benzyl-(4-(4-methyl-5-(p-tolylsulfonyl)-1,3-thiazol-2-yl)phenyl)carbamate $\ce{(C25H22N2O4S2)}$	Slow evaporation from ethyl acetate (EtOAc)	P2_{1}/n, monoclinic (Z′ = 1)
Polymorphic hydrate (XXI)	Gallic acid monohydrate $\ce{(C7H6O5*H2O)}$	Slow evaporation from methanol in presence of sarcosine	P2_{1}/c, monoclinic (Z′ = 1)

== Crystal structure prediction methods ==
Crystal structure prediction methods can be grouped into two categories, global methods and local methods. Global methods are usually targeted towards finding the global minima in the potential energy surface (PES) and attempt to sample the entire PES, while local methods are more focused. Some examples of global methods that can be applied towards CSP include random structure searching, particle swarm optimization, and genetic and evolutionary algorithms. Some examples of local methods include metadynamics, minima hopping, basin-hopping, and "following" soft phonon modes.

=== Random structure searching ===
Random structure searching is an approach for crystal structure prediction that broadly consists of two steps: (1) generating random structures and (2) relaxing the structures to local minima. These steps are repeated until the search has converged. The definition of convergence can vary depending upon the application, but typically refers to when the lowest energy structure has been found multiple times. Relaxing the random structures reduces the size of the search space, as the potential energy surface can be divided into basins of attraction, where a relaxation of any structure in that region of the phase space will lead to the same local minima. To further reduce the dimensionality of the search space, constraints are often applied to the random structures generated. Some types of constraints that have been applied include: minimum distance constraints, stoichiometric constraints, symmetry constraints, and constraints based on experimental knowledge of the system.

Random structure searching has been applied successfully to a variety of systems, including high pressure silane, phosphorus anode materials, and cathode materials.

== Crystal structure prediction software ==
The following codes can predict stable and metastable structures given chemical composition and external conditions (pressure, temperature):

- AIRSS - Ab Initio Random Structure Searching based on stochastic sampling of configuration space and with the possibility to use symmetry, chemical, and physical constraints. Has been used to study bulk crystals, low-dimensional materials, clusters, point defects, and interfaces. Released under the GPL2 licence. Regularly updated.
- CALYPSO - The Crystal structure AnaLYsis by Particle Swarm Optimization, implementing the particle swarm optimization (PSO) algorithm to identify/determine the crystal structure. As with other codes, knowledge of the structure can be used to design multi-functional materials (e.g., superconductive, thermoelectric, superhard, and energetic materials). Free for academic researchers. Regularly updated.
- GASP - predicts the structure and composition of stable and metastable phases of crystals, molecules, atomic clusters and defects from first-principles. Can be interfaced to other energy codes including: VASP, LAMMPS, MOPAC, Gulp, JDFTx etc. Free to use and regularly updated.
- GRACE - for predicting molecular crystal structures, especially for the pharmaceutical industry. Based on dispersion-corrected density functional theory. Commercial software under active development.
- GULP - Monte Carlo and genetic algorithms for atomic crystals. GULP is based on classical force fields and works with many types of force fields. Free for academic researchers. Regularly updated.
- USPEX - multi-method software that includes evolutionary algorithms and other methods (random sampling, evolutionary metadynamics, improved PSO, variable-cell NEB method and transition path sampling method for phase transition mechanisms). Can be used for atomic and molecular crystals; bulk crystals, nanoparticles, polymers, surface reconstructions, interfaces; can optimize the energy or other physical properties. In addition to finding the structure for a given composition, can identify all stable compositions in a multicomponent variable-composition system and perform simultaneous optimisation of several properties. Free for academic researchers. Used by >4500 researchers. Regularly updated.
- XtalOpt - open source code implementing an evolutionary algorithm.
- FLAME - open source code implementing the minima hopping method.
