= DMA =

DMA may refer to:

== Arts ==
- DMA (magazine), a defunct dance music magazine
- Dallas Museum of Art, in Texas, US
- BT Digital Music Awards, an annual event in the UK
- Danish Music Awards
- Detroit Music Awards
- Doctor of musical arts, a degree
- DMA's, an Australian alternative rock band
  - DMA's (album), their eponymous fifth album released in 2026

== Organisations ==
- DMA Design, now Rockstar North, a video game developer in Edinburgh, Scotland
- Danish Medical Association
- Derbyshire Miners' Association, England
- Data & Marketing Association, formerly Direct Marketing Association
- Durham Miners' Association, a trade union

=== Education ===
- DMA eV, (Deutsch-Marokkanische Akademiker e.V) an academic association for German and Moroccan graduates in Hanover, Germany
- Delaware Military Academy, US
- Digital Media Academy, US

=== Government and military ===
- Davis–Monthan Air Force Base (IATA airport code), near Tucson, Arizona, US
- Defense Mapping Agency, a former agency of the US Department of Defense
- Defense Media Activity, an organization of the US Department of Defense
- Department of Military Affairs, India

== Places ==
- Dominica (IOC code)
- Dublin Metropolitan Area, an Irish jurisdiction

== Science and technology ==
- Dynamic mechanical analysis of a polymer's viscoelasticity
- Differential mobility analyzer, an instrument to measure particle size distribution

=== Chemistry ===
- Botiacrine, also known as (S)-[2-(dimethylamino)ethyl] 9,9-dimethylacridine-10-carbothioate (DMA), an antiparkinsonian drug
- Delmadinone acetate, a veterinary drug
- Dimethandrolone, an anabolic–androgenic steroid
- Dimethoxyamphetamine, a psychedelic phenethylamine
- Dimethylacetamide, an organic solvent
- Dimethylamine
- Dimethylaniline
- Distributed multipole analysis, a method to describe the charge distribution of a molecule
- Dimethylarsinic acid

=== Computing ===
- Direct memory access
- Dynamic memory allocation
- Dynamic Microprocessor Associates, developer of pcAnywhere
- DragonFly Mail Agent, in the DragonFly BSD operating system

== Other uses ==
- Designated market area, a region whose population can receive the same media offerings
- Digital Markets Act, a European Union regulation for digital platform fairness
- Direct market access, used in financial markets
- Peugeot DMA, a historical light van and pickup truck
- Movies Anywhere, previously called Disney Movies Anywhere
