= Enrique Alba =

Spanish computer science professor (born 1968)

Prof. Enrique Alba
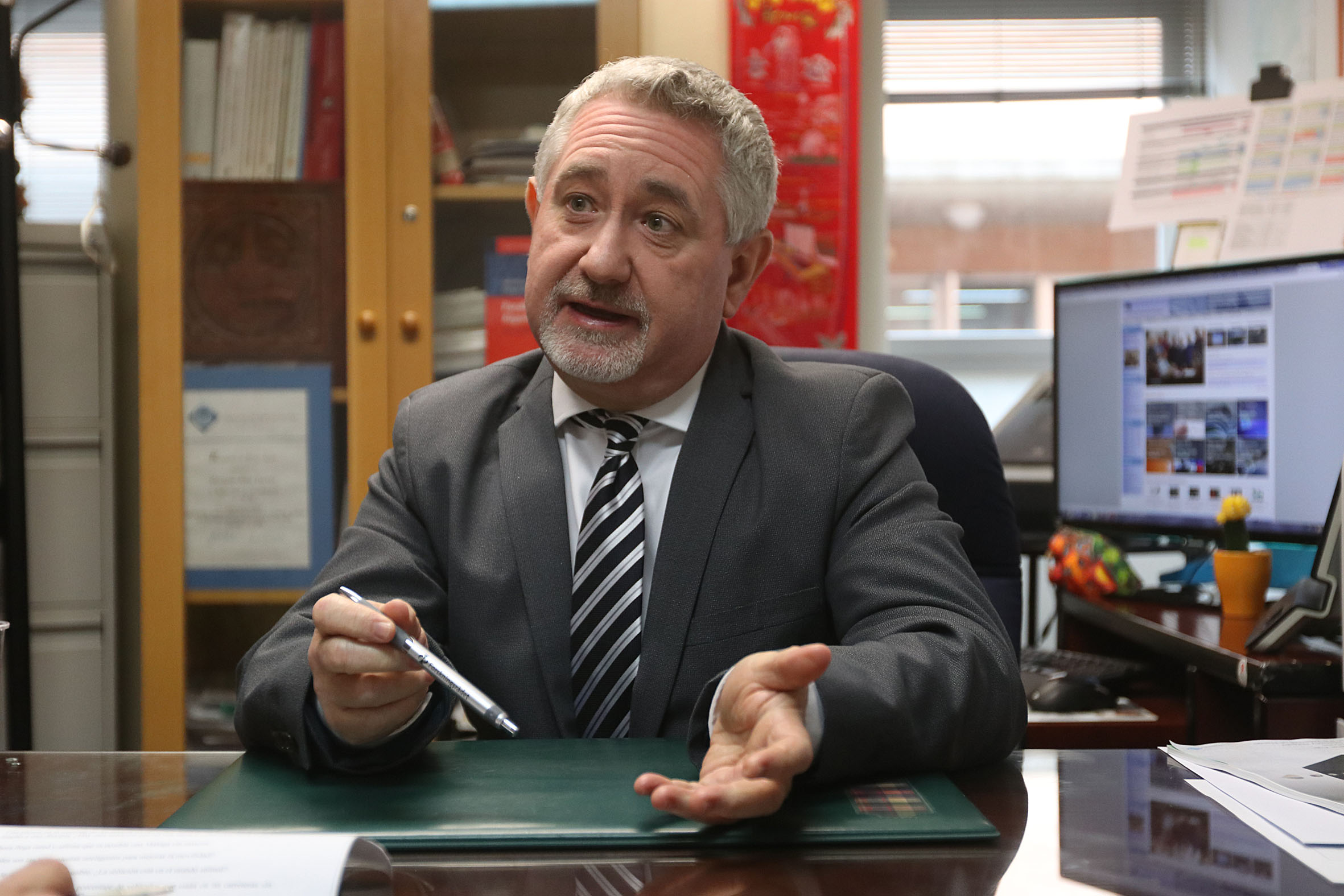
- Born: 23 October 1968 (age 57); Málaga, Spain
- Scientific career
- Fields: Computer science, Artificial Intelligence, Smart Cities, High Performance Computing, Quantum Computing, Software Engineering
- Workplaces: University of Málaga; European Research Council

Enrique Alba is a professor of computer science at the University of Málaga, Spain.

== Overview ==
Prof. Alba achieved his Ph.D. degree on designing and analyzing parallel and distributed genetic algorithms, now better known as neuroevolution. His current research interests involve the design and application of evolutionary algorithms, ant colony optimization, particle swarm optimization, and other bio-inspired systems to real problems including telecommunications, software engineering, combinatorial optimization, and bioinformatics among others. The main focus of all his work is on parallel metaheuristics (high-performance computing in general) and multiobjective optimization to deal with human preferences and conflicting criteria in complex problems. In the last 10 years, Prof. Alba's interests in terms of applications focused on smart cities and AI for quantum computing.

== Work ==
Prof. Alba leads the NEO (Networking and Emerging Optimization) group at the University of Málaga, Spain.

His ongoing research includes the fields of ad hoc metropolitan network optimization, optimal design of GSM networks, logistics, vehicle routing, natural language tagging, software engineering, DNA fragment assembly, gene microarrays, cutting/packing, software testing and validation, and in general combinatorial problems lying in the base of real-world problems. New fields like multiobjective techniques with high scalability, grid/P2P/Internet platforms, dynamic optimization of problems whose definition change in time, and heterogeneous algorithms are dealt with as part both of basic and applied research. He has been involved in many projects and Ph.D. theses dealing with the construction and utilization of vehicular ad hoc networks, as well as has started a whole line of research in Bio-inspired techniques, and metaheuristics for smart cities and AI for quantum computing.

As for the science behind the applications, Prof. Alba and his group are dealing mainly with metaheuristics, either bio-inspired or not, and also hybridization with other (possibly exact) methods. Specifically, genetic algorithms, particle swarm, ant colonies, simulated annealing, branch and bound, differential evolution, variable neighbourhood search, and related solvers are used. The link to machine learning for feature selection, prediction, prescription, and the theory behind the design and complexity of algorithms has led to numerous publications in top venues, international projects, and industry contracts (see here for more info).

Prof. Alba has published seven books on metaheuristics and bio-inspired techniques, more than 130 papers indexed in ISI impact journals, and more than 300 conference papers. He has raised funds and coordinated several Spanish national research projects like TRACER, OPLINK, M*, DIRICOM, roadME, moveON, 6city, HUMOVE, ECO-IOT. His work has achieved internationalization via his participation in bilateral projects with INRIA like PERFOM, MOID, Robust&Green, and European CELTIC projects like CARLINK, FP7 COADVISE, fiQare, and TAILOR. He holds active collaborations by joining publications and exchanges with more than 20 international universities and labs, and his research in Málaga is also innovating with industrial transferences to several companies including TARTEC S.A., OPTIMI, Arelance, NOVASOFT, ETRA I+D, Moviquity, VTT, Synergiums, EMERGYA, SECMOTIC, ACTECO, EUROSOTERRADOS, TORCAL, JUMA and others. Prof. Alba has also led the one-million lab 6sim for harnessing modern GPUs in the fields of AI and Simulation.

Alba works in the program committee of leading conferences in several fields, including ACM GECCO, IEEE CEC, PPSN, EvoStar, IPDPS, as well as organizing international events frequently. He also has worked as a reviewer for the IEEE Transactions Journals on Evolutionary Computation, Education, and Parallel and Distributed Systems. Besides, he is an active reviewer for SMC, JPDC, PARCO, Journal of Heuristics, JMMA, EJOR, Computer Communications, MIT Evolutionary Computation, Software: Practice and Experience, and Information Sciences, to name a few.

According to Google Scholar, as of 2024 he has an h-index of 72 and more than 24,700 citations to his work.

From September 2021 to February 2026 Prof. Alba is seconded to Brussels to work in the European Research Council (ERC) for managing funds for supporting computer science in Europe and around the world. Now in a sabbatical at UCL (London) till September 2026.

== See also ==
- Parallel Metaheuristics
- Cellular Evolutionary Algorithms
- Metaheuristics
- Evolutionary Algorithm
- Swarm Intelligence
- Optimization
- Machine Learning
