= Great Flood (disambiguation) =

Great Flood is a phrase used to describe the central event in any catastrophic flood. Some may be of the flood myth, whether historically accurate or mythological, while others are severe floods from around the world.

Great Flood may also refer to:

- Outburst flood, evidence for prehistoric floods sometimes individually referred to as great floods
- Flood myth and List of flood myths
- Genesis flood narrative in the Hebrew and Christian Bible, which includes Noah's Ark
- Great Flood (China), a flood dating from the 3rd millennium BC
- Great Flood of 1823, in Bedford
- Great Flood of 1844, the biggest flood ever recorded on the Missouri River and Upper Mississippi River in terms of discharge
- Great Flood of 1851 in the Midwest U.S.
- Great Flood of 1862, a flood in California, U.S.
- Great Sheffield Flood, a flood that devastated parts of Sheffield, England on 11 March 1864
- Great Flood of 1881, a natural disaster in Omaha, Nebraska
- Johnstown Flood, known locally as the Great Flood of 1889
- 1910 Great Flood of Paris, a January 1910 flooding of the River Seine
- Great Flood of 1913, a natural disaster in Indiana, Ohio and ten other states in the U.S.
  - Great Dayton Flood, part of the Great Flood of 1913
- Boston Molasses Disaster of 1919, known locally as the Great Molasses Flood
- Great flood of 99, 1924 flooding of the Periyar River in Kerala, India; in year 1099 of the Malayalam calendar (hence the name)
- Great Mississippi Flood of 1927, the most destructive river flood in U.S. history
- Great Flood of 1951, a July 1951 flooding of the Kansas River in the U.S. state of Kansas
- Great Flood of 1968, a flood caused by very heavy rain that struck South East England and France in mid-September 1968
- Great Flood of 1993 in the Midwest US, one of the most costly and devastating in U.S. history
- The Great Flood (film), a 2025 South Korean science fiction disaster film

== See also ==
- Great Deluge algorithm, a term in mathematics which uses an alternate form of the phrase
