= DMAC =

DMAC, D-MAC, or D-Mac may refer to:

== People ==
- Donovan McNabb (born 1976), a quarterback for the Washington Redskins, formerly of the Philadelphia Eagles
- Darren McFadden (born 1987), a running back formerly of the University of Arkansas Razorbacks and currently with the Oakland Raiders
- Darryl McDonald (born 1964), a retired American-Australian professional basketball player
- Devin McCourty (born 1987), an American football safety for the New England Patriots
- Rhea Dimaculangan-Villarete (born 1991), a Filipina volleyball player

== Science and medicine ==
- Dimethylacetamide (DMAc), a widely used chemical solvent
- Disseminated Mycobacterium avium-intracellulare complex, the systemic type of Mycobacterium avium-intracellulare infection
- Dubai Medium Aperture Camera, the primary payload of the observation satellite DubaiSat-1

== Other uses ==
- Digital Media Arts College, a private college in Boca Raton, Florida, USA
- D-MAC, a variant of the MAC (Multiplexed Analogue Components) systems for television broadcasting
- Diving Medical Advisory Council, an independent organisation of diving medical specialists
- Direct memory access controller, a device used to perform direct memory access
- A version of the Wu-tang dance

== See also ==
- DMA (disambiguation)
- p-dimethylaminocinnamaldehyde (DMACA), a chemical and a method to evaluate the polyphenolic content of a sample
