= Adaptive simulated annealing =

Adaptive simulated annealing (ASA) is a variant of simulated annealing (SA) algorithm in which the algorithm parameters that control temperature schedule and random step selection are automatically adjusted according to algorithm progress. This makes the algorithm more efficient and less sensitive to user defined parameters than canonical SA. These are in the standard variant often selected on the basis of experience and experimentation (since optimal values are problem dependent), which represents a significant deficiency in practice.

The algorithm works by representing the parameters of the function to be optimized as continuous numbers, and as dimensions of a hypercube (N dimensional space). Some SA algorithms apply Gaussian moves to the state, while others have distributions permitting faster temperature schedules. Imagine the state as a point in a box and the moves as a rugby-ball shaped cloud around it. The temperature and the step size are adjusted so that all of the search space is sampled to a coarse resolution in the early stages, whilst the state is directed to favorable areas in the late stages. Another ASA variant, thermodynamic simulated annealing, automatically adjusts the temperature at each step based on the energy difference between the two states, according to the laws of thermodynamics.

== See also ==
- Simulated annealing
- Combinatorial optimization
- Optimization
