= Cellular evolutionary algorithm =

Kind of evolutionary algorithm

A cellular evolutionary algorithm (cEA) is a kind of evolutionary algorithm (EA) in which individuals cannot mate arbitrarily, but every one interacts with its closer neighbors on which a basic EA is applied (selection, variation, replacement).

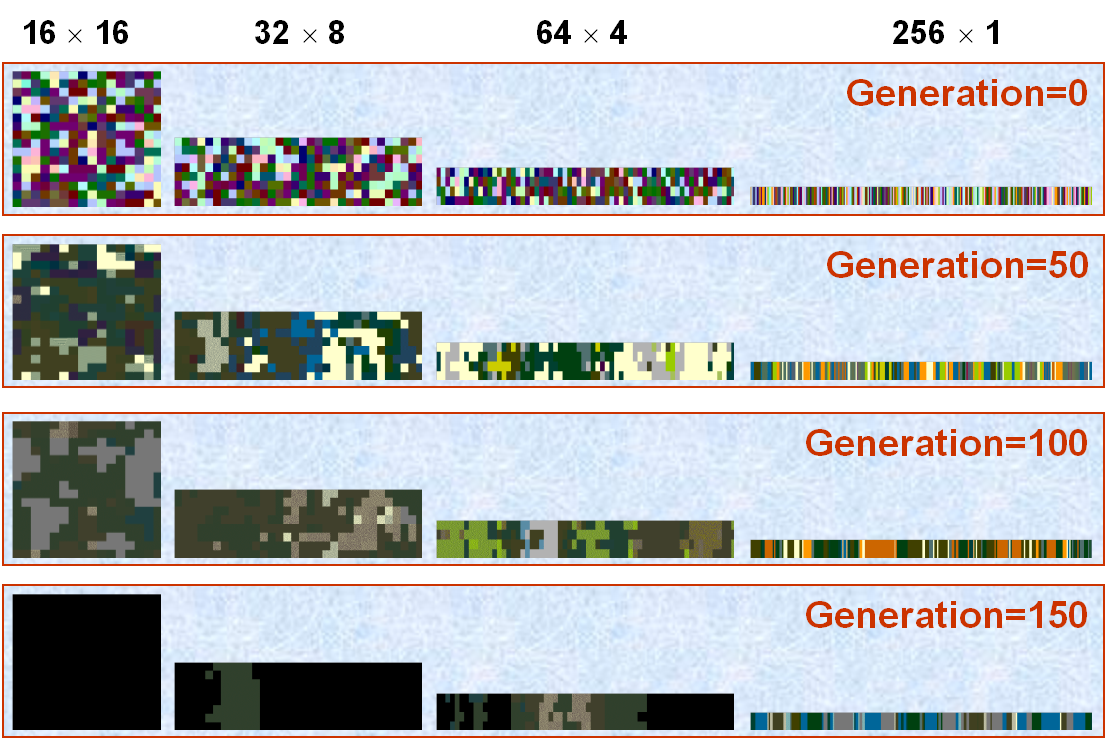
Example evolution of a cEA depending on the shape of the population, from squared (left) to one-dimensional ring (right), at generations 0, 50, 100, and 150. Darker colors mean better solutions. Note how shapes different from the traditional square keep diversity (i.e. greater amounts of exploration) for a longer time.

The cellular model simulates natural evolution from the point of view of the individual, which encodes a tentative optimization, learning, or search problem solution. The essential idea of this model is to provide the EA population with a special structure defined as a connected graph, in which each vertex is an individual that communicates with its nearest neighbors. Particularly, individuals are conceptually set in a toroidal mesh, and are only allowed to recombine with close individuals. This leads to a kind of locality known as "isolation by distance". The set of potential mates of an individual is called its neighborhood. It is known that, in this kind of algorithm, similar individuals tend to cluster creating niches, and these groups operate as if they were separate sub-populations (islands). There is no clear demarcation between adjacent groups and close niches could be easily "colonized" by competitive niches, potentially merging solution contents during the process.

== Introduction ==
A cellular evolutionary algorithm (cEA) typically evolves a structured two-dimensional grid of individuals, although other topologies are also possible. In this grid, clusters of similar individuals are naturally created during evolution, thereby promoting exploration in their boundaries. Exploitation is mainly performed by direct competition and merging inside them.

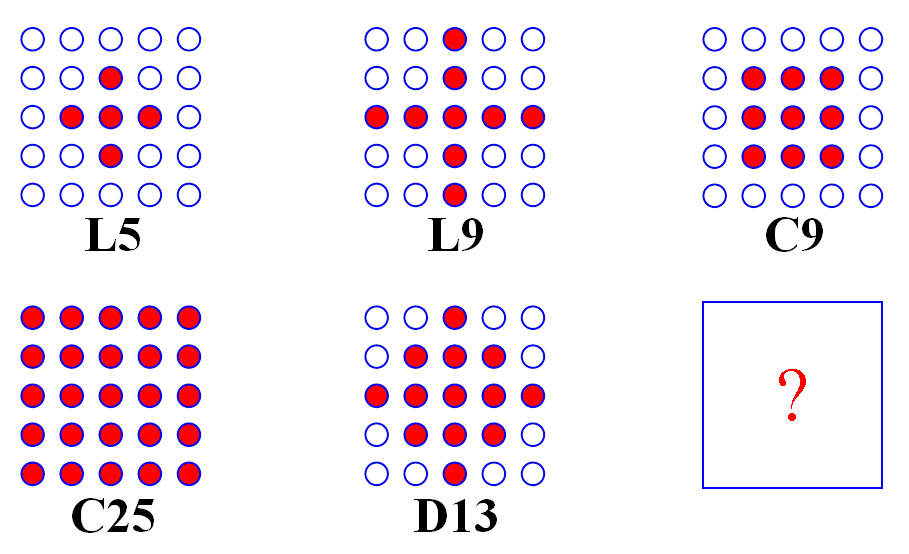
Example models of neighborhoods in cellular EAs: linear (L), compact (C), diamond (D).

The grid is usually 2D toroidal structure, although the number of dimensions can be easily extended or reduced (to 1D, i.e. a ring). The neighborhood of a particular point of the grid (where an individual is placed) is defined in terms of the Manhattan distance from it to others in the population. Each point of the grid has a neighborhood that overlaps the neighborhoods of nearby individuals. In the basic algorithm, all the neighborhoods have the same size and identical shapes. The two most commonly used neighborhoods are L5, also called the von Neumann or NEWS (North, East, West and South) neighborhood, and C9, also known as the Moore neighborhood. Here, L stands for "linear" while C stands for "compact".

In cEAs, the individuals can only interact with their neighbors in the reproductive cycle where the variation operators are applied. This reproductive cycle is executed inside the neighborhood of each individual and, generally, consists in selecting two parents among its neighbors according to a certain criterion, applying the variation operators to them (recombination and mutation for example), and replacing the considered individual by the recently created offspring following a given criterion, for instance, replace if the offspring represents a better solution than the considered individual.

== Synchronous versus asynchronous ==
In a regular synchronous cEA, the algorithm proceeds from the very first top left individual to the right and then to the several rows by using the information in the population to create a new temporary population. After finishing with the bottom-right last individual the temporary population is full with the newly computed individuals, and the replacement step starts. In it, the old population is completely and synchronously replaced with the newly computed one according to some criterion. Usually, the replacement keeps the best individual in the same position of both populations, that is, elitism is used.

According to the update policy of the population used, an asynchronous cEA may also be defined and is a well-known issue in cellular automata. In asynchronous cEAs the order in which the individuals in the grid are update changes depending on the choice of criterion: line sweep, fixed random sweep, new random sweep, and uniform choice. All four proceed using the newly computed individual (or the original if better) for the computations of its neighbors.

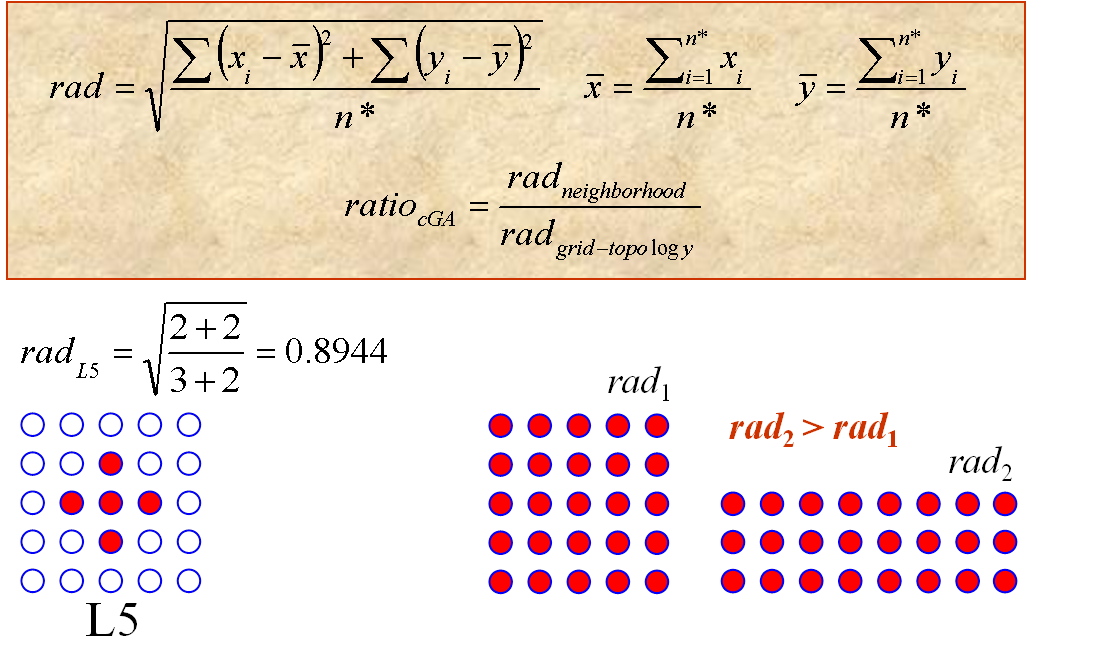
The ratio between the radii of the neighborhood to the topology defines the exploration/exploitation capability of the cEA. This could be even tuned during the run of the algorithm, giving the researcher a unique mechanism to search in very complex landscapes.

The overlap of the neighborhoods provides an implicit mechanism of solution migration to the cEA. Since the best solutions spread smoothly through the whole population, genetic diversity in the population is preserved longer than in non structured EAs. This soft dispersion of the best solutions through the population is one of the main issues of the good tradeoff between exploration and exploitation that cEAs perform during the search. This tradeoff can be tuned (and by extension the genetic diversity level along the evolution) by modifying (for instance) the size of the neighborhood used, as the overlap degree between the neighborhoods grows according to the size of the neighborhood.

A cEA can be seen as a cellular automaton (CA) with probabilistic rewriting rules, where the alphabet of the CA is equivalent to the potential number of solutions of the problem. Hence, knowledge from research in CAs can be applied to cEAs.

== Parallelism ==
Cellular EAs are very amenable to parallelism, thus usually found in the literature of parallel metaheuristics. In particular, fine grain parallelism can be used to assign independent threads of execution to every individual, thus allowing the whole cEA to run on a concurrent or actually parallel hardware platform. In this way, large time reductions can be obtained when running cEAs on FPGAs or GPUs.

However, it is important to stress that cEAs are a model of search, in many senses different from traditional EAs. Also, they can be run in sequential and parallel platforms, reinforcing the fact that the model and the implementation are two different concepts.

See here for a complete description on the fundamentals for the understanding, design, and application of cEAs.

== See also ==
- Cellular automaton
- Dual-phase evolution
- Enrique Alba
- Evolutionary algorithm
- Metaheuristic
- Parallel metaheuristic
