= Late acceptance hill climbing =

Metaheuristic search method

Late acceptance hill climbing, created by Yuri Bykov in 2008 is a metaheuristic search method employing local search methods used for mathematical optimization.
