= Distributed multipole analysis =

Way of describing a molecule's charge distribution

In computational chemistry, distributed multipole analysis (DMA) is a compact and accurate way of describing the spatial distribution of electric charge within a molecule.

== Multipole expansion ==
The DMA method was devised by Prof. Anthony Stone of Cambridge University to describe the charge distribution of a molecule in terms of a multipole expansion around a number of centers. The idea of using a multi-center multipole expansion was earlier proposed by Robert Rein. Typically, the centers correspond to the atoms constituting the molecule, though this is not a requirement. A multipole series, consisting of a charge, dipole, quadrupole and higher terms is located at each center. Importantly, the radius of convergence of this multipole series is sufficiently small that the relevant series will be convergent when describing two molecules in van der Waals contact.

The DMA series are derived from ab initio or density functional theory calculations using Gaussian basis sets. If the molecular orbitals are written as linear combinations of atomic basis functions the electron density takes the form of a sum of products of the basis functions, called density matrix elements. Boys (1950) showed that the product of two spherical Gaussian functions, centered at different points, can be expressed as a single Gaussian at an intermediate point known as the overlap center.

If a basis of Gaussian functions is used, the product of two s functions is spherically symmetric and can be represented completely just by a point charge at the ‘overlap center’ of the two Gaussian functions. The product of an s orbital and a p orbital has only charge and dipole components, and the product of two p functions has charge, dipole and quadrupole components.

If the overlap center is not at an atom, one can move the origin of the multipole expansion to the nearest distributed multipole site, re-expressing the series to account for the change of origin. The multipole expansion will no longer terminate, but the higher terms will be small. One may take the sites wherever one chooses, but they will usually be at the atoms. For small molecules one may wish to use additional sites at the centers of bonds; for larger molecules one may use a single site to describe a group of atoms such as a methyl group. The DMA procedure is exact and very fast, but for modern large basis sets with diffuse basis functions it has to be modified somewhat. When the basis functions have exponents that are small, the product function extends over several atoms, and it is better to calculate the distributed multipoles by numerical quadrature over a grid of points. The grid can be defined so that each point is associated with a particular site, and the multipoles for each site are obtained by quadrature over the points belonging to that site.

This description then includes at each site:

- Charges, describing electronegativity effects in a chemically intuitive way;
- Dipoles, arising from overlap of s and p orbitals and describing lone pairs and other atomic distortions;
- Quadrupoles, arising from the overlap of p orbitals, and associated with pi bonds, for example;
- Octopoles and hexadecapoles can be included if very high accuracy is required.

The DMA describes the potential at points outside the molecule with an accuracy which is essentially that of the wavefunction, so that its use entails no loss of precision. The DMA description gives the electrostatic energy of interaction between two molecules. It does not account for charge overlap effects and hence excludes the penetration energy.

== Comparison to other methods ==
DMA is inherently much more accurate than the commonly used partial charge methodologies for calculating intermolecular interaction energies, since it captures anisotropy of the atom-atom contributions to electrostatic interaction. It may therefore seem surprising that it has not been more widely used in molecular simulation. Possible reasons for this are:

- Its non-inclusion in popular simulation codes;
- The need to keep track of the orientation of a local axis system for each molecule;
- The conformation-dependence of the DMA. As a consequence of its accuracy, the DMA captures features of the molecular charge distribution that depend strongly on molecular conformation. Thus, in a DMA-based simulation, the multipoles would have to be recalculated whenever a molecule underwent a conformational change.

== Applications ==
DMA has found extensive use in crystal structure prediction for small organic molecules, where significant progress can often be made while using rigid molecular structures. It has also been used to develop force fields for molecular simulations, such as the AMOEBA force field.
