= DMA eV =

German-Moroccan Academics Association (Deutsch-Marokkanische Akademiker e.V)
- Founded: March 24, 2012
- Founder: 7 co-founders
- Type: Non-profit association
- Location: Hannover, Germany
- Key people: Mustapha El Jouhari (leader), Marouane Sabir and Abdellatif Wahbi (co-founder,
- Website: www.dma-ev.de

DMA eV, (in German: Deutsch-Marokkanische Akademiker e.V) is an academic association for German and Moroccan graduates. The association is active in most university-cities in Germany. The main office of the association is located by Leibniz University Hannover, Germany.

Founded on March 24, 2012 with the goal to connect Moroccan and German academics in Germany and Morocco. The association is organizing frequently conferences for Moroccan and German invitees. The activities contain academical as well as cultural and sportive events. The DMA association is one of the most active associations of the Moroccan diaspora in Germany.

== Objectives ==
The German-Moroccan academics association defines its objectives and goals as:

- development and maintaining of a network between academics (German and Moroccan) in Germany and in Morocco.
- to create a platform for meetings and meaning/experience exchange.
- to enhance the dialogue between cultures and peoples.
- to organize and support cultural events.
- to submit students an easy introduction to the student and social life and support them in their studies.
- to support development aid and to participate in international development cooperation
- to advise and assist students (with migration background) for their further education and excellence factors.
