= Digital Media Academy =

- Company type: Private
- Founded: 1999
- Website: www.digitalmediaacademy.org

Digital Media Academy is a digital art and technology education company, located in Palo Alto, CA, and Vancouver, BC, primarily offering STEM summer camp and arts programs for students, age 9-18, at several universities in the US and Canada, including Stanford, Harvard, UCSD, Chicago, NYU, UBC, UoT, and more. Digital Media Academy Certified Schools offers curriculum and teaching resources to K-12 schools globally to empower every educator to integrate technology into their classroom in a way that works for them.

Digital Media Academy began as the Academy for New Media at Stanford University in the late 1990s as a program of Stanford's Academic Department and was officially incorporated in 2002. The Academy for New Media was created at Stanford by Phil Gibson in 1999 for K-12 educators and high-school students interested in learning the latest digital media software tools from award-winning creative professionals. Digital Media Academy was born in the Fall of 2001 after the Academy for New Media became closed due to budget cuts. Stanford University's Continuing Studies department offered CEU credits through Digital Media Academy from 2002-2014. In the Fall of 2017, the Company changed ownership, with Gibson exiting completely in 2018. Students may attend Digital Media Academy summer camps with the day camp or residential camp option or enroll in online courses.

== Partnerships ==
Digital Media Academy by a grant from The Nudelman Family Trust offers a 1,000 full scholarship program to make its courses accessible to underprivileged children and has partnered with various non-profit and community-focused organizations including the New Media Consortium and the CUE.
