= Bees algorithm =

Population-based search algorithm

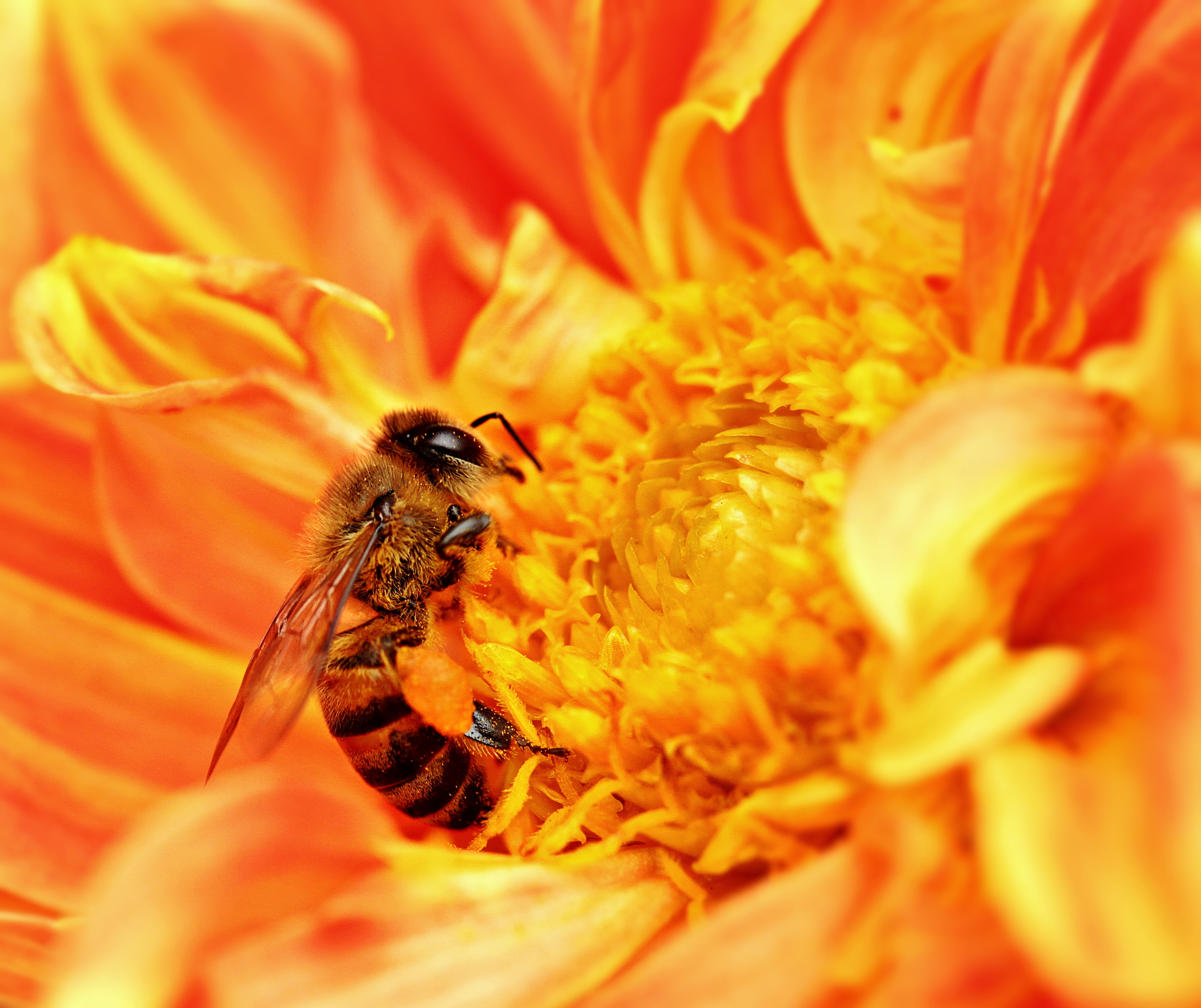
The bee algorithm mimics the foraging behavior of honey bees.

In computer science and operations research, the bees algorithm is a population-based search algorithm which was developed by Pham, Ghanbarzadeh et al. in 2005. It mimics the food foraging behaviour of honey bee colonies. In its basic form, the algorithm combines local neighbourhood search with global exploration of the search space. It can be used for both combinatorial optimization and continuous optimization. The only condition for the application of the bees algorithm is that some measure of distance between the solutions is defined. A number of studies have demonstrated the specific capabilities and effectiveness of the bees algorithm.

== Metaphor ==
A colony of honey bees can extend itself over long distances (over 14 km) and in multiple directions simultaneously to harvest nectar or pollen from multiple food sources (flower patches). A small fraction of the colony constantly searches the environment looking for new flower patches. These scout bees move randomly in the area surrounding the hive, evaluating the profitability (net energy yield) of the food sources encountered. When they return to the hive, the scouts deposit the food harvested. Those individuals that found a highly profitable food source go to an area in the hive called the “dance floor”, and perform a ritual known as the waggle dance. Through the waggle dance a scout bee communicates the location of its discovery to idle onlookers, which join in the exploitation of the flower patch. Since the length of the dance is proportional to the scout’s rating of the food source, more foragers get recruited to harvest the best rated flower patches. After dancing, the scout returns to the food source it discovered to collect more food. As long as they are evaluated as profitable, rich food sources will be advertised by the scouts when they return to the hive. Recruited foragers may waggle dance as well, increasing the recruitment for highly rewarding flower patches. Thanks to this autocatalytic process, the bee colony is able to quickly switch the focus of the foraging effort on the most profitable flower patches.

== Algorithm ==
The bees algorithm mimics the foraging strategy of honey bees to look for the best solution to an optimisation problem. Each candidate solution is thought of as a food source (flower), and a population (colony) of n agents (bees) is used to search the solution space. Each time an artificial bee visits a flower (lands on a solution), it evaluates its profitability (fitness).

The bees algorithm consists of an initialisation procedure and a main search cycle which is iterated for a given number T of times, or until a solution of acceptable fitness is found. Each search cycle is composed of five procedures: recruitment, local search, neighbourhood shrinking, site abandonment, and global search.

Pseudocode for the standard bees algorithm[2]
   1 for i = 1, ..., ns
       i  scout[i] = Initialise_scout()
       ii flower_patch[i] = Initialise_flower_patch(scout[i])
   2 do until stopping_condition = TRUE
       i   Recruitment() 
       ii  for i = 1, ..., na
             1 flower_patch[i] = Local_search(flower_patch[i])
             2 flower_patch[i] = Site_abandonment(flower_patch[i])
             3 flower_patch[i] = Neighbourhood_shrinking(flower_patch[i])
       iii for i = nb, ..., ns
             1 flower_patch[i] = Global_search(flower_patch[i])}

In the initialisation routine ns scout bees are randomly placed in the search space, and evaluate the fitness of the solutions where they land. For each solution, a neighbourhood (called flower patch) is delimited.

In the recruitment procedure, the scouts that visited the nb≤ns fittest solutions (best sites) perform the waggle dance. That is, they recruit foragers to search further the neighbourhoods of the most promising solutions. The scouts that located the very best ne≤nb solutions (elite sites) recruit nre foragers each, whilst the remaining nb-ne scouts recruit nrb≤nre foragers each. Thus, the number of foragers recruited depends on the profitability of the food source.

In the local search procedure, the recruited foragers are randomly scattered within the flower patches enclosing the solutions visited by the scouts (local exploitation). If any of the foragers in a flower patch lands on a solution of higher fitness than the solution visited by the scout, that forager becomes the new scout. If no forager finds a solution of higher fitness, the size of the flower patch is shrunk (neighbourhood shrinking procedure). Usually, flower patches are initially defined over a large area, and their size is gradually shrunk by the neighbourhood shrinking procedure. As a result, the scope of the local exploration is progressively focused on the area immediately close to the local fitness best. If no improvement in fitness is recorded in a given flower patch for a pre-set number of search cycles, the local maximum of fitness is considered found, the patch is abandoned (site abandonment), and a new scout is randomly generated.

As in biological bee colonies, a small number of scouts keeps exploring the solution space looking for new regions of high fitness (global search). The global search procedure re-initialises the last ns-nb flower patches with randomly generated solutions.

At the end of one search cycle, the scout population is again composed of ns scouts: nr scouts produced by the local search procedure (some of which may have been re-initialised by the site abandonment procedure), and ns-nb scouts generated by the global search procedure. The total artificial bee colony size is n=ne•nre+(nb-ne)•nrb+ns (elite sites foragers + remaining best sites foragers + scouts) bees.

== Variants ==
Several modified and hybrid variants of the bees algorithm have been proposed, including the enhanced bees algorithm (EBA), grouped bees algorithm (GBA), modified bees algorithm (MBA) and hybrid modified bees algorithm (MBA).

The pseudo-MATLAB code for the grouped BA (GBA) is as follows.

function GBA
 %% Set the problem parameters
maxIteration = ..;			% number of iterations (e.g. 1000-5000)
maxParameters = ..;			% number of input variables
min = [..] ;				% an array of the size maxParameters to indicate the minimum value of each input parameter 
max = [..] ;				% an array of the size maxParameters to indicate the maximum value of each input parameter

 %% Set the grouped bees algorithm (GBA) parameters
R_ngh = ..;	            % patch radius of the neighborhood search for bees in the first group (e.g. 0.001 - 1)
n = ..;					% number of scout bees (e.g. 4-30)
nGroups = ..;			% number of groups, excluding the random group

 %% GBA's automatic parameter settings
k = 3 * n / ((nGroups+1)^3 - 1); 	% GBA's parameter to set the number of scout bees in each group
groups = zeros(1,nGroups);    		% An array to keep the number of scout bees for each group
recruited_bees = zeros(1,nGroups);	% An array to keep the number of recruited bees for each group
a = (((max - min) ./ 2) - R_ngh) ./ (nGroups^2 - 1);	% GBA's parameter for setting neighborhood radiuses
b = R_ngh - a;											% GBA's parameter for setting neighborhood radiuses
for i=1:nGroups % For each group
    groups(i) = floor(k*i^2);			% determine the number of scout bees in each group
    if groups(i) == 0
        groups(i) = 1;					% there has to be at least one scout bee per each group
    end
	recruited_bees = (nGroups+1-i)^2;	% set the number of recruited bees for each group
	ngh(i) = a * i*i + b;				% set the radius patch for each group
end
group_random = n - sum(groups);			% assign the remainder bees (if any) to random search
group_random = max(group_random,0);		% make sure it is not a negative number

 %% initialize the population matrix
population = zeros(n,maxParameters+1); 	% A population of n bees including all input variables and their fitness
for i=1:n
    population(i,1:maxParameters)= generate_random_solution(maxParameters,min, max);	% random initialization of maxParameters variables between max and min
    population(i,maxParameters+1) = evalulate_fitness(population(i,:));					% fitness evaluation of each solution and saving it at the last index of the population matrix
end

sorted_population = sortrows(population); % sort the population based on their fitnesses

 %% Iterations of the grouped bees algorithm
for i=1:maxIteration         	% GBA's main loop
	beeIndex = 0;				% keep track of all bees (i.e, patches)
	for g=1:nGroups 			% for each group of scout bees
		for j =  1 : groups(g) 	% exploit each patch within each group
			beeIndex = beeIndex + 1;		% increase the counter per each patch
			for i = 1 : recruited_bees(g)	% for each recruited bees of the group
				solution = bee_waggle_dance(sorted_population(beeIndex,1:maxParameters),ngh(g));			% search the neighborhood around selected patch/solution within the radius of ngh
				fit = evaluate_fitness(solution);															% evaluate the fitness of recently found solution
				if  fit < sorted_population(beeIndex,maxParameters+1) % A minimization problem: if a better location/patch/solution is found by the recuiter bee
					sorted_population(beeIndex,1 : maxParameters+1) = [solution(1 : maxParameters),fit];	% copy new solution and its fitness to the sorted population matrix
				end
			end
		end
	end

	for i= 1 : group_random % For the remaining random bees
		beeIndex = beeIndex + 1;
		solution(beeIndex,1:maxParameters)= generate_random_solution(maxParameters,min, max); 	% generate a new random solution at the index beeIndex
		solution(beeIndex,maxParameters+1)= evaluate_fitness(solution);							% evaluate its fitness
		sorted_population(beeIndex,:) = [solution(1 : maxParameters),fit]; 						% copy the new random solution and its fitness to the sorted population matrix
	end

	sorted_population=sortrows(sorted_population); 	% sort the population based on their fitnesses
	Best_solution_sofar=sorted_population(1,:);

	disp('Best:');disp(Best_solution_sofar); % Display the best solution of current iteration
end % end of GBA's main loop 
end % end of main function

%% Function Bee Waggle Dance
function new_solution=bee_waggle_dance(solution, ngh, maxParameters)
    new_solution(1:maxParameters) = (solution-ngh)+(2*ngh.*rand(1, maxParameters));
end

== See also ==
- Ant colony optimization algorithms
- Artificial bee colony algorithm
- Evolutionary computation
- Lévy flight foraging hypothesis
- Manufacturing Engineering Centre
- Mathematical optimization
- Metaheuristic
- Particle swarm optimization
- Swarm intelligence
