= DFO =

DFO may refer to:

== Businesses and organizations ==
- Dairy Farmers of Ontario, Canada
- Department of Fisheries and Oceans, Canada
- Direct Factory Outlet, Australia
- German Women's Order (Deutscher Frauenorden or DFO), merged into the National Socialist Women's League

== Science ==
- 1,8-Diazafluoren-9-one, a chemical that reveals fingerprints
- Deferoxamine, medication for iron overdose
- Dispersive flies optimisation, a swarm intelligence algorithm

== Other uses ==
- Dungeon Fighter Online, a 2009 computer game
