= Test functions for optimization =

Functions used to evaluate optimization algorithms

In applied mathematics, test functions, known as artificial landscapes, are useful to evaluate characteristics of optimization algorithms, such as convergence rate, precision, robustness and general performance.

Here some test functions are presented with the aim of giving an idea about the different situations that optimization algorithms have to face when coping with these kinds of problems. In the first part, some objective functions for single-objective optimization cases are presented. In the second part, test functions with their respective Pareto frontiers for multi-objective optimization problems (MOP) are given.

The artificial landscapes presented herein for single-objective optimization problems are taken from Bäck, Haupt et al. and from Rody Oldenhuis software. Given the number of problems (55 in total), just a few are presented here.

The test functions used to evaluate the algorithms for MOP were taken from Deb, Binh et al. and Binh. The software developed by Deb can be downloaded, which implements the NSGA-II procedure with GAs, or the program posted on Internet, which implements the NSGA-II procedure with ES.

Just a general form of the equation, a plot of the objective function, boundaries of the object variables and the coordinates of global minima are given herein.

== Test functions for single-objective optimization ==
Name	Plot	Formula	Global minimum	Search domain
Rastrigin function	Rastrigin function for n=2	$f(\mathbf{x}) = A n + \sum_{i=1}^n \left[x_i^2 - A\cos(2 \pi x_i)\right]$ $\text{where: } A=10 \text{ and } \mathbf{x} \in \mathbb{R}^n$	$f(0, \dots, 0) = 0$	$-5.12\le x_{i} \le 5.12$
Ackley function	Ackley's function for n=2	$f(x,y) = -20\exp\left[-0.2\sqrt{0.5\left(x^{2}+y^{2}\right)}\right]$ $-\exp\left[0.5\left(\cos 2\pi x + \cos 2\pi y \right)\right] + e + 20$	$f(0,0) = 0$	$-5\le x,y \le 5$ !!should be $-\infty\le x,y \le \infty$ ??
Sphere function	Sphere function for n=2	$f(\boldsymbol{x}) = \sum_{i=1}^{n} x_{i}^{2}$	$f(x_{1}, \dots, x_{n}) = f(0, \dots, 0) = 0$	$-\infty \le x_{i} \le \infty$, $1 \le i \le n$
Rosenbrock function	Rosenbrock's function for n=2	$f(\boldsymbol{x}) = \sum_{i=1}^{n-1} \left[ 100 \left(x_{i+1} - x_{i}^{2}\right)^{2} + \left(1 - x_{i}\right)^{2}\right]$	$$\text{Min} = \begin{cases} n=2 & \rightarrow \quad f(1,1) = 0, \\ n=3 & \rightarrow \quad f(1,1,1) = 0, \\ n>3 & \rightarrow \quad f(\underbrace{1,\dots,1}_{n \text{ times}}) = 0 \\ \end{cases}$$	$-\infty \le x_{i} \le \infty$, $1 \le i \le n$
Beale function	Beale's function	$f(x,y) = \left( 1.5 - x + xy \right)^{2} + \left( 2.25 - x + xy^{2}\right)^{2}$ $+ \left(2.625 - x+ xy^{3}\right)^{2}$	$f(3, 0.5) = 0$	$-4.5 \le x,y \le 4.5$
Goldstein–Price function	Goldstein–Price function	$f(x,y) = \left[1+\left(x+y+1\right)^{2}\left(19-14x+3x^{2}-14y+6xy+3y^{2}\right)\right]$ $\left[30+\left(2x-3y\right)^{2}\left(18-32x+12x^{2}+48y-36xy+27y^{2}\right)\right]$	$f(0, -1) = 3$	$-2 \le x,y \le 2$
Booth function	Booth's function	$f(x,y) = \left( x + 2y -7\right)^{2} + \left(2x +y - 5\right)^{2}$	$f(1,3) = 0$	$-10 \le x,y \le 10$
Bukin function N.6	Bukin function N.6	$f(x,y) = 100\sqrt{\left|y - 0.01x^{2}\right|} + 0.01 \left|x+10 \right|.\quad$	$f(-10,1) = 0$	$-15\le x \le -5$, $-3\le y \le 3$
Matyas function	Matyas function	$f(x,y) = 0.26 \left( x^{2} + y^{2}\right) - 0.48 xy$	$f(0,0) = 0$	$-10\le x,y \le 10$
Lévi function N.13	Lévi function N.13	$f(x,y) = \sin^{2} 3\pi x + \left(x-1\right)^{2}\left(1+\sin^{2} 3\pi y\right)$ $+\left(y-1\right)^{2}\left(1+\sin^{2} 2\pi y\right)$	$f(1,1) = 0$	$-10\le x,y \le 10$
Griewank function	Griewank's function	$f(\boldsymbol{x})= 1+ \frac {1}{4000} \sum _{i=1}^n x_i^2 -\prod _{i=1}^n P_i(x_i)$, where $P_i(x_i)=\cos \left( \frac {x_i}{\sqrt {i}} \right)$	$f(0, \dots, 0) = 0$	$-\infty \le x_{i} \le \infty$, $1 \le i \le n$
Himmelblau's function	Himmelblau's function	$f(x, y) = (x^2+y-11)^2 + (x+y^2-7)^2.\quad$	$$\text{Min} = \begin{cases} f\left(3.0,  2.0\right) & = 0.0 \\ f\left(-2.805118, 3.131312\right) & = 0.0 \\ f\left(-3.779310, -3.283186\right) & = 0.0 \\ f\left(3.584428, -1.848126\right) & = 0.0 \\ \end{cases}$$	$-5\le x,y \le 5$
Three-hump camel function	Three Hump Camel function	$f(x,y) = 2x^{2} - 1.05x^{4} + \frac{x^{6}}{6} + xy + y^{2}$	$f(0,0) = 0$	$-5\le x,y \le 5$
Easom function	Easom function	$f(x,y) = -\cos \left(x\right)\cos \left(y\right) \exp\left(-\left(\left(x-\pi\right)^{2} + \left(y-\pi\right)^{2}\right)\right)$	$f(\pi , \pi) = -1$	$-100\le x,y \le 100$
Cross-in-tray function	Cross-in-tray function	$f(x,y) = -0.0001 \left[ \left| \sin x \sin y \exp \left(\left|100 - \frac{\sqrt{x^{2} + y^{2}}}{\pi} \right|\right)\right| + 1 \right]^{0.1}$	$$\text{Min} = \begin{cases} f\left(1.34941, -1.34941\right) & = -2.06261 \\ f\left(1.34941,  1.34941\right) & = -2.06261 \\ f\left(-1.34941, 1.34941\right) & = -2.06261 \\ f\left(-1.34941,-1.34941\right) & = -2.06261 \\ \end{cases}$$	$-10\le x,y \le 10$
Eggholder function	Eggholder function	$f(x,y) = - \left(y+47\right) \sin \sqrt{\left|\frac{x}{2}+\left(y+47\right)\right|} - x \sin \sqrt{\left|x - \left(y + 47 \right)\right|}$	$f(512, 404.2319) = -959.6407$	$-512\le x,y \le 512$
Hölder table function	Holder table function	$f(x,y) = - \left|\sin x \cos y \exp \left(\left|1 - \frac{\sqrt{x^{2} + y^{2}}}{\pi} \right|\right)\right|$	$$\text{Min} = \begin{cases} f\left(8.05502,  9.66459\right) & = -19.2085 \\ f\left(-8.05502,  9.66459\right) & = -19.2085 \\ f\left(8.05502,-9.66459\right) & = -19.2085 \\ f\left(-8.05502,-9.66459\right) & = -19.2085 \end{cases}$$	$-10\le x,y \le 10$
McCormick function	McCormick function	$f(x,y) = \sin \left(x+y\right) + \left(x-y\right)^{2} - 1.5x + 2.5y + 1$	$f(-0.54719,-1.54719) = -1.9133$	$-1.5\le x \le 4$, $-3\le y \le 4$
Schaffer function N. 2	Schaffer function N.2	$f(x,y) = 0.5 + \frac{\sin^{2}\left(x^{2} - y^{2}\right) - 0.5}{\left[1 + 0.001\left(x^{2} + y^{2}\right) \right]^{2}}$	$f(0, 0) = 0$	$-100\le x,y \le 100$
Schaffer function N. 4	Schaffer function N.4	$f(x,y) = 0.5 + \frac{\cos^{2}\left[\sin \left( \left|x^{2} - y^{2}\right|\right)\right] - 0.5}{\left[1 + 0.001\left(x^{2} + y^{2}\right) \right]^{2}}$	$$\text{Min} = \begin{cases} f\left(0,1.25313\right) & = 0.292579 \\ f\left(0,-1.25313\right) & = 0.292579 \\ f\left(1.25313,0\right) & = 0.292579 \\ f\left(-1.25313,0\right) & = 0.292579 \end{cases}$$	$-100\le x,y \le 100$
Styblinski–Tang function	Styblinski-Tang function	$f(\boldsymbol{x}) = \frac{\sum_{i=1}^{n} x_{i}^{4} - 16x_{i}^{2} + 5x_{i}}{2}$	$-39.16617n < f(\underbrace{-2.903534, \ldots, -2.903534}_{n \text{ times}} ) < -39.16616n$	$-5\le x_{i} \le 5$, $1\le i \le n$..
Shekel function	A Shekel function in 2 dimensions and with 10 maxima	$f(\boldsymbol{x}) = \sum_{i = 1}^{m} \; \left( c_{i} + \sum\limits_{j = 1}^{n} (x_{j} - a_{ji})^2 \right)^{-1}$		$-\infty \le x_{i} \le \infty$, $1 \le i \le n$ ??? $?? \le m \le ??$

== Test functions for constrained optimization ==
Name	Plot	Formula	Global minimum	Search domain
Rosenbrock function constrained to a disk	Rosenbrock function constrained to a disk	$f(x,y) = (1-x)^2 + 100(y-x^2)^2$, subjected to: $x^2 + y^2 \le 2$	$f(1.0,1.0) = 0$	$-1.5\le x \le 1.5$, $-1.5\le y \le 1.5$
Mishra's Bird function - constrained	Bird function (constrained)	$f(x,y) = \sin(y) e^{\left [(1-\cos x)^2\right]} + \cos(x) e^{\left [(1-\sin y)^2 \right]} + (x-y)^2$, subjected to: $(x+5)^2 + (y+5)^2 < 25$	$f(-3.1302468,-1.5821422) = -106.7645367$	$-10\le x \le 0$, $-6.5\le y \le 0$
Townsend function (modified)	Heart constrained multimodal function	$f(x,y) = -[\cos((x-0.1)y)]^2 - x \sin(3x+y)$, subjected to:$x^2+y^2 < \left[2\cos t - \frac 1 2 \cos 2t - \frac 1 4 \cos 3t - \frac 1 8 \cos 4t\right]^2 + [2\sin t]^2$ where: t = Atan2(x,y)	$f(2.0052938,1.1944509) = -2.0239884$	$-2.25\le x \le 2.25$, $-2.5\le y \le 1.75$
Keane's bump function	Keane's bump function	$f(\boldsymbol{x}) = -\left| \frac{\left[ \sum_{i=1}^m \cos^4 (x_i) - 2 \prod_{i=1}^m \cos^2 (x_i) \right]}{{\left( \sum_{i=1}^m ix^2_i \right)}^{0.5}} \right|$, subjected to: $0.75 - \prod_{i=1}^m x_i < 0$, and $\sum_{i=1}^m x_i - 7.5m < 0$	$f((1.60025376,0.468675907)) = -0.364979746$	$0 < x_i < 10$

== Test functions for multi-objective optimization ==
Name	Plot	Functions	Constraints	Search domain
Binh and Korn function:	Binh and Korn function	$$\text{Minimize} = \begin{cases} f_{1}\left(x,y\right) = 4x^{2} + 4y^{2} \\ f_{2}\left(x,y\right) = \left(x - 5\right)^{2} + \left(y - 5\right)^{2} \\ \end{cases}$$	$$\text{s.t.} = \begin{cases} g_{1}\left(x,y\right) = \left(x - 5\right)^{2} + y^{2} \leq 25 \\ g_{2}\left(x,y\right) = \left(x - 8\right)^{2} + \left(y + 3\right)^{2} \geq 7.7 \\ \end{cases}$$	$0\le x \le 5$, $0\le y \le 3$
Chankong and Haimes function:	Chakong and Haimes function	$$\text{Minimize} = \begin{cases} f_{1}\left(x,y\right) = 2 + \left(x-2\right)^{2} + \left(y-1\right)^{2} \\ f_{2}\left(x,y\right) = 9x - \left(y - 1\right)^{2} \\ \end{cases}$$	$$\text{s.t.} = \begin{cases} g_{1}\left(x,y\right) = x^{2} + y^{2} \leq 225 \\ g_{2}\left(x,y\right) = x - 3y + 10 \leq 0 \\ \end{cases}$$	$-20\le x,y \le 20$
Fonseca–Fleming function:	Fonseca and Fleming function	$$\text{Minimize} = \begin{cases} f_{1}\left(\boldsymbol{x}\right) = 1 - \exp \left[-\sum_{i=1}^{n} \left(x_{i} - \frac{1}{\sqrt{n}} \right)^{2} \right] \\ f_{2}\left(\boldsymbol{x}\right) = 1 - \exp \left[-\sum_{i=1}^{n} \left(x_{i} + \frac{1}{\sqrt{n}} \right)^{2} \right] \\ \end{cases}$$		$-4\le x_{i} \le 4$, $1\le i \le n$
Test function 4:	Test function 4.	$$\text{Minimize} = \begin{cases} f_{1}\left(x,y\right) = x^{2} - y \\ f_{2}\left(x,y\right) = -0.5x - y - 1 \\ \end{cases}$$	$$\text{s.t.} = \begin{cases} g_{1}\left(x,y\right) = 6.5 - \frac{x}{6} - y \geq 0 \\ g_{2}\left(x,y\right) = 7.5  - 0.5x - y \geq 0 \\ g_{3}\left(x,y\right) = 30  - 5x - y \geq 0 \\ \end{cases}$$	$-7\le x,y \le 4$
Kursawe function:	Kursawe function	$$\text{Minimize} = \begin{cases} f_{1}\left(\boldsymbol{x}\right) = \sum_{i=1}^{2} \left[-10 \exp \left(-0.2 \sqrt{x_{i}^{2} + x_{i+1}^{2}} \right) \right] \\ & \\ f_{2}\left(\boldsymbol{x}\right) = \sum_{i=1}^{3} \left[\left|x_{i}\right|^{0.8}  + 5 \sin \left(x_{i}^{3} \right) \right] \\ \end{cases}$$		$-5\le x_{i} \le 5$, $1\le i \le 3$.
Schaffer function N. 1:	Schaffer function N.1	$$\text{Minimize} = \begin{cases} f_{1}\left(x\right) = x^{2} \\ f_{2}\left(x\right) = \left(x-2\right)^{2} \\ \end{cases}$$		$-A\le x \le A$. Values of $A$ from $10$ to $10^{5}$ have been used successfully. Higher values of $A$ increase the difficulty of the problem.
Schaffer function N. 2:	Schaffer function N.2	$$\text{Minimize} = \begin{cases} f_{1}\left(x\right) = \begin{cases} -x,   & \text{if } x \le 1 \\ x-2, & \text{if } 1 < x \le 3 \\ 4-x, & \text{if } 3 < x \le 4 \\ x-4, & \text{if } x > 4 \\ \end{cases} \\ f_{2}\left(x\right) = \left(x-5\right)^{2} \\ \end{cases}$$		$-5\le x \le 10$.
Poloni's two objective function:	Poloni's two objective function	$$\text{Minimize} = \begin{cases} f_{1}\left(x,y\right) = \left[1 + \left(A_{1} - B_{1}\left(x,y\right) \right)^{2} + \left(A_{2} - B_{2}\left(x,y\right) \right)^{2} \right] \\ f_{2}\left(x,y\right) = \left(x + 3\right)^{2} + \left(y + 1 \right)^{2} \\ \end{cases}$$ $$\text{where} = \begin{cases} A_{1} = 0.5 \sin \left(1\right) - 2 \cos \left(1\right) + \sin \left(2\right) - 1.5 \cos \left(2\right)  \\ A_{2} = 1.5 \sin \left(1\right) - \cos \left(1\right) + 2 \sin \left(2\right) - 0.5 \cos \left(2\right)  \\ B_{1}\left(x,y\right) = 0.5 \sin \left(x\right) - 2 \cos \left(x\right) + \sin \left(y\right) - 1.5 \cos \left(y\right)  \\ B_{2}\left(x,y\right) = 1.5 \sin \left(x\right) - \cos \left(x\right) + 2 \sin \left(y\right) - 0.5 \cos \left(y\right) \end{cases}$$		$-\pi\le x,y \le \pi$
Zitzler–Deb–Thiele's function N. 1:	Zitzler-Deb-Thiele's function N.1	$$\text{Minimize} = \begin{cases} f_{1}\left(\boldsymbol{x}\right) = x_{1} \\ f_{2}\left(\boldsymbol{x}\right) = g\left(\boldsymbol{x}\right) h \left(f_{1}\left(\boldsymbol{x}\right),g\left(\boldsymbol{x}\right)\right) \\ g\left(\boldsymbol{x}\right) = 1 + \frac{9}{29} \sum_{i=2}^{30} x_{i} \\ h \left(f_{1}\left(\boldsymbol{x}\right),g\left(\boldsymbol{x}\right)\right) = 1 - \sqrt{\frac{f_{1}\left(\boldsymbol{x}\right)}{g\left(\boldsymbol{x}\right)}} \\ \end{cases}$$		$0\le x_{i} \le 1$, $1\le i \le 30$.
Zitzler–Deb–Thiele's function N. 2:	Zitzler-Deb-Thiele's function N.2	$$\text{Minimize} = \begin{cases} f_{1}\left(\boldsymbol{x}\right) = x_{1} \\ f_{2}\left(\boldsymbol{x}\right) = g\left(\boldsymbol{x}\right) h \left(f_{1}\left(\boldsymbol{x}\right),g\left(\boldsymbol{x}\right)\right) \\ g\left(\boldsymbol{x}\right) = 1 + \frac{9}{29} \sum_{i=2}^{30} x_{i} \\ h \left(f_{1}\left(\boldsymbol{x}\right),g\left(\boldsymbol{x}\right)\right) = 1 - \left(\frac{f_{1}\left(\boldsymbol{x}\right)}{g\left(\boldsymbol{x}\right)}\right)^{2} \\ \end{cases}$$		$0\le x_{i} \le 1$, $1\le i \le 30$.
Zitzler–Deb–Thiele's function N. 3:	Zitzler-Deb-Thiele's function N.3	$$\text{Minimize} = \begin{cases} f_{1}\left(\boldsymbol{x}\right) = x_{1} \\ f_{2}\left(\boldsymbol{x}\right) = g\left(\boldsymbol{x}\right) h \left(f_{1}\left(\boldsymbol{x}\right),g\left(\boldsymbol{x}\right)\right) \\ g\left(\boldsymbol{x}\right) = 1 + \frac{9}{29} \sum_{i=2}^{30} x_{i} \\ h \left(f_{1}\left(\boldsymbol{x}\right),g\left(\boldsymbol{x}\right)\right) = 1 - \sqrt{\frac{f_{1}\left(\boldsymbol{x}\right)}{g\left(\boldsymbol{x} \right)}} - \left(\frac{f_{1}\left(\boldsymbol{x}\right)}{g\left(\boldsymbol{x}\right)} \right) \sin \left(10 \pi f_{1} \left(\boldsymbol{x} \right) \right) \end{cases}$$		$0\le x_{i} \le 1$, $1\le i \le 30$.
Zitzler–Deb–Thiele's function N. 4:	Zitzler-Deb-Thiele's function N.4	$$\text{Minimize} = \begin{cases} f_{1}\left(\boldsymbol{x}\right) = x_{1} \\ f_{2}\left(\boldsymbol{x}\right) = g\left(\boldsymbol{x}\right) h \left(f_{1}\left(\boldsymbol{x}\right),g\left(\boldsymbol{x}\right)\right) \\ g\left(\boldsymbol{x}\right) = 91 + \sum_{i=2}^{10} \left(x_{i}^{2} - 10 \cos \left(4 \pi x_{i}\right) \right) \\ h \left(f_{1}\left(\boldsymbol{x}\right),g\left(\boldsymbol{x}\right)\right) = 1 - \sqrt{\frac{f_{1}\left(\boldsymbol{x}\right)}{g\left(\boldsymbol{x} \right)}} \end{cases}$$		$0\le x_{1} \le 1$, $-5\le x_{i} \le 5$, $2\le i \le 10$
Zitzler–Deb–Thiele's function N. 6:	Zitzler-Deb-Thiele's function N.6	$$\text{Minimize} = \begin{cases} f_{1}\left(\boldsymbol{x}\right) = 1 - \exp \left(-4x_{1}\right)\sin^{6}\left(6 \pi x_{1} \right) \\ f_{2}\left(\boldsymbol{x}\right) = g\left(\boldsymbol{x}\right) h \left(f_{1}\left(\boldsymbol{x}\right),g\left(\boldsymbol{x}\right)\right) \\ g\left(\boldsymbol{x}\right) = 1 + 9 \left[\frac{\sum_{i=2}^{10} x_{i}}{9}\right]^{0.25} \\ h \left(f_{1}\left(\boldsymbol{x}\right),g\left(\boldsymbol{x}\right)\right) = 1 - \left(\frac{f_{1}\left(\boldsymbol{x}\right)}{g\left(\boldsymbol{x} \right)}\right)^{2} \\ \end{cases}$$		$0\le x_{i} \le 1$, $1\le i \le 10$.
Osyczka and Kundu function:	Osyczka and Kundu function	$$\text{Minimize} = \begin{cases} f_{1}\left(\boldsymbol{x}\right) = -25 \left(x_{1}-2\right)^{2} - \left(x_{2}-2\right)^{2} - \left(x_{3}-1\right)^{2} - \left(x_{4}-4\right)^{2} - \left(x_{5}-1\right)^{2} \\ f_{2}\left(\boldsymbol{x}\right) = \sum_{i=1}^{6} x_{i}^{2} \\ \end{cases}$$	$$\text{s.t.} = \begin{cases} g_{1}\left(\boldsymbol{x}\right) = x_{1} + x_{2} - 2 \geq 0 \\ g_{2}\left(\boldsymbol{x}\right) = 6 - x_{1} - x_{2} \geq 0 \\ g_{3}\left(\boldsymbol{x}\right) = 2 - x_{2} + x_{1} \geq 0 \\ g_{4}\left(\boldsymbol{x}\right) = 2 - x_{1} + 3x_{2} \geq 0 \\ g_{5}\left(\boldsymbol{x}\right) = 4 - \left(x_{3}-3\right)^{2} - x_{4} \geq 0 \\ g_{6}\left(\boldsymbol{x}\right) = \left(x_{5} - 3\right)^{2} + x_{6} - 4 \geq 0 \end{cases}$$	$0\le x_{1},x_{2},x_{6} \le 10$, $1\le x_{3},x_{5} \le 5$, $0\le x_{4} \le 6$.
CTP1 function (2 variables):	CTP1 function (2 variables).	$$\text{Minimize} = \begin{cases} f_{1}\left(x,y\right) = x \\ f_{2}\left(x,y\right) = \left(1 + y\right) \exp \left(-\frac{x}{1+y} \right) \end{cases}$$	$$\text{s.t.} = \begin{cases} g_{1}\left(x,y\right) = \frac{f_{2}\left(x,y\right)}{0.858 \exp \left(-0.541 f_{1}\left(x,y\right)\right)} \geq 1 \\ g_{2}\left(x,y\right) = \frac{f_{2}\left(x,y\right)}{0.728 \exp \left(-0.295 f_{1}\left(x,y\right)\right)} \geq 1 \end{cases}$$	$0\le x,y \le 1$.
Constr-Ex problem:	Constr-Ex problem.	$$\text{Minimize} = \begin{cases} f_{1}\left(x,y\right) = x \\ f_{2}\left(x,y\right) = \frac{1 + y}{x} \\ \end{cases}$$	$$\text{s.t.} = \begin{cases} g_{1}\left(x,y\right) = y + 9x \geq 6 \\ g_{2}\left(x,y\right) = -y + 9x \geq 1 \\ \end{cases}$$	$0.1\le x \le 1$, $0\le y \le 5$
Viennet function:	Viennet function	$$\text{Minimize} = \begin{cases} f_{1}\left(x,y\right) = 0.5\left(x^{2} + y^{2}\right) + \sin\left(x^{2} + y^{2} \right) \\ f_{2}\left(x,y\right) = \frac{\left(3x - 2y + 4\right)^{2}}{8} +  \frac{\left(x - y + 1\right)^{2}}{27} + 15 \\ f_{3}\left(x,y\right) = \frac{1}{x^{2} + y^{2} + 1} - 1.1 \exp \left(- \left(x^{2} + y^{2} \right) \right) \\ \end{cases}$$		$-3\le x,y \le 3$.
