= Grey Wolf Optimization =

Nature-inspired algorithm

Grey Wolf Optimization (GWO) is a nature-inspired metaheuristic algorithm that mimics the leadership hierarchy and hunting behavior of grey wolves in the wild. It was introduced by Seyedali Mirjalili in 2014 as a swarm intelligence-based technique for solving optimization problems. The algorithm is designed based on the social dominance structure of grey wolves, where the pack is led by an alpha, followed by beta and delta wolves, while omegas hold the lowest rank. This leadership hierarchy plays a crucial role in guiding the search for optimal solutions by balancing exploration and exploitation. The alpha wolves guide the hunt, while the beta and delta wolves assist in refining the movement and decision-making process.

In GWO, optimization is performed through three main steps: encircling prey, hunting, and attacking or diverging towards new solutions. Encircling is the process where wolves adjust their positions relative to the best solutions found so far. Hunting involves the collective effort of alpha, beta, and delta wolves, which estimate the prey’s location and guide the pack toward optimal solutions. Finally, the attack phase focuses on intensifying the search by reducing the distance between wolves and the best-known solution, ensuring convergence. If the solution space needs further exploration, the wolves diverge, helping prevent premature convergence to local optima.

One of the significant advantages of GWO is its simplicity and ability to handle complex optimization problems with fewer control parameters than other metaheuristic algorithms like genetic algorithms or particle swarm optimization. Its efficiency in finding global optima makes it suitable for a wide range of applications, including power system optimization, feature selection in machine learning, and structural engineering. Additionally, its ability to balance exploration and exploitation helps maintain diversity in the search process, reducing the likelihood of getting stuck in local minima.

In power system applications, GWO has been widely used for optimizing network configurations, enhancing resilience, and reducing operational costs. For instance, in resilient distribution network design, GWO helps allocate feeder routing, substation facilities, and reinforcement strategies to mitigate the impact of physical attacks or natural disasters. By considering both economic and technical constraints, the algorithm finds an optimal trade-off between resilience and cost-effectiveness. Its adaptability to large-scale problems makes it particularly useful in complex power grid scenarios where multiple variables must be optimized simultaneously.

Despite its advantages, GWO has some limitations, such as its reliance on the initial population and the potential for slow convergence in high-dimensional spaces. To improve its performance, researchers have proposed hybrid approaches that integrate GWO with other optimization techniques, such as fuzzy logic, artificial neural networks, or differential evolution. These modifications aim to enhance solution accuracy, speed, and adaptability in dynamic environments. Overall, GWO remains a powerful and flexible optimization tool with broad applications in engineering, machine learning, and power system resilience.

== See also ==
- Particle swarm optimization
