= Shekel function =

Function used as a performance test problem for optimization algorithms

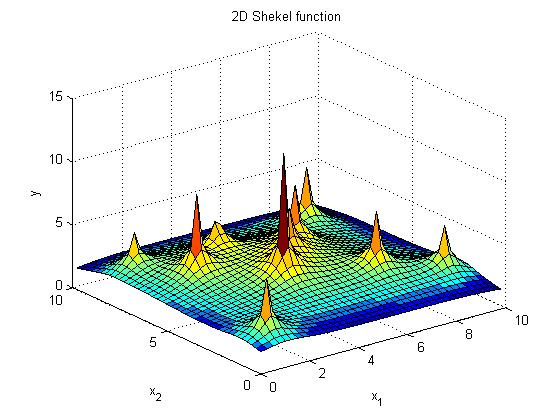
A Shekel function in 2 dimensions and with 10 maxima

The Shekel function or also Shekel's foxholes is a multidimensional, multimodal, continuous, deterministic function commonly used as a test function for testing optimization techniques.

The mathematical form of a function in $n$ dimensions with $m$ maxima is:

$f(\vec{x}) = \sum_{i = 1}^{m} \; \left( c_{i} + \sum\limits_{j = 1}^{n} (x_{j} - a_{ji})^2 \right)^{-1}$

or, similarly,

$f(x_1,x_2,...,x_{n-1},x_n) = \sum_{i = 1}^{m} \; \left( c_{i} + \sum\limits_{j = 1}^{n} (x_{j} - a_{ij})^2 \right)^{-1}$

== Global minima ==
Numerically certified global minima and the corresponding solutions were obtained using interval methods for up to $n = 10$.

== See also ==
- Test functions for optimization
