= Ackley function =

Function used as a performance test problem for optimization algorithms

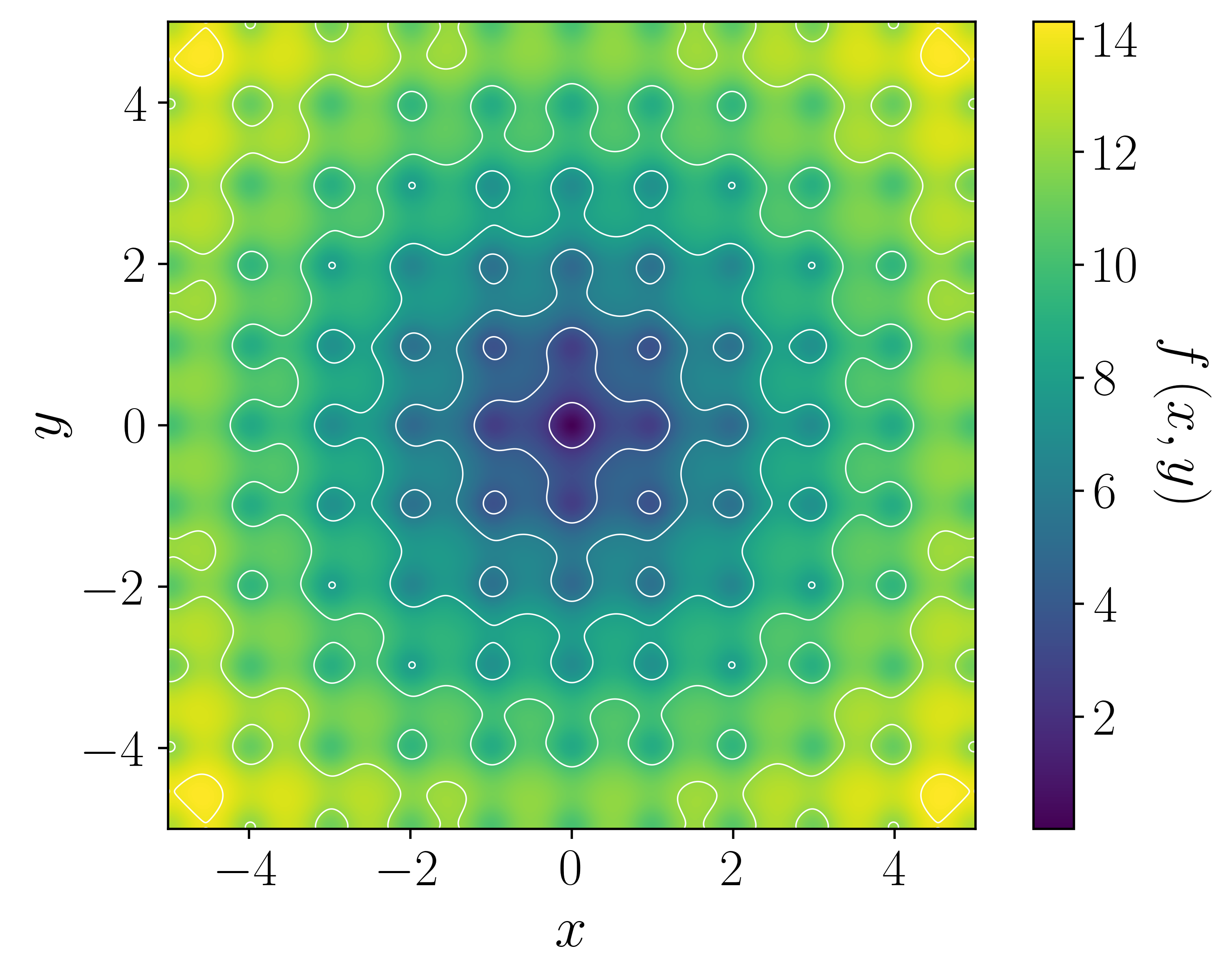
Ackley function of two variables

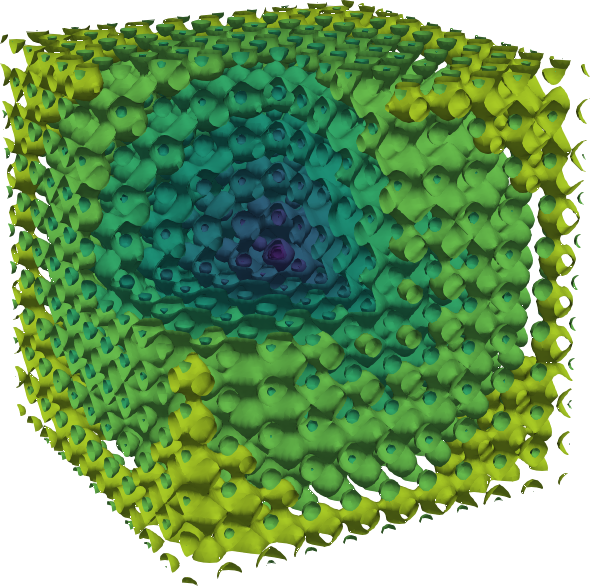
Contour surfaces of Ackley's function in 3D

In mathematical optimization, the Ackley function is a non-convex function used as a performance test problem for optimization algorithms. It was proposed by David Ackley in his 1987 PhD dissertation. The function is commonly used as a minimization function with global minimum value 0 at 0,.., 0 in the form due to Thomas Bäck. While Ackley gives the function as an example of "fine-textured broadly unimodal space" his thesis does not actually use the function as a test.

On an $d$-dimensional domain it is defined as:

$f(\mathbf{x}) = -a \exp \left( -b \sqrt{\frac{1}{d} \sum_{i=1}^d x_i^2} \right)$

$- \exp \left( \frac{1}{d} \sum_{i=1}^d \cos(c x_i) \right) + a + \exp(1)$

Recommended variable values are $a = 20$, $b = 0.2$, and $c = 2\pi$.

The global minimum is $f(\mathbf{x}^*) = 0$ at $\mathbf{x}^* = \mathbf{0}$.

== See also ==
- Test functions for optimization
