= Artificial bee colony algorithm =

Algorithm in computer science

In computer science and operations research, the artificial bee colony algorithm (ABC) is an optimization algorithm based on the intelligent foraging behaviour of honey bee swarm, proposed by Derviş Karaboğa (Erciyes University) in 2005.

== Algorithm ==
In the ABC algorithm, a food source represents a candidate solution to an optimization problem. The amount of nectar associated with the food source represents the quality, or fitness, of that solution.

The colony consists of three groups of bees: employed bees, onlookers and scouts. It is assumed that there is only one artificial employed bee for each food source. In other words, the number of employed bees in the colony is equal to the number of food sources around the hive.

Employed bees visit their food sources and return to the hive, where they communicate information about them through dances. When a food source is abandoned, its employed bee becomes a scout and searches for a new food source.

The main steps of the ABC algorithm are as follows:

- Initial food sources are produced for all employed bees
- REPEAT
  - Each employed bee goes to a food source in her memory and determines a closest source, then evaluates its nectar amount and dances in the hive
  - Each onlooker watches the dance of employed bees and chooses one of their sources depending on the dances, and then goes to that source. After choosing a neighbour around that, she evaluates its nectar amount.
  - Abandoned food sources are determined and are replaced with the new food sources discovered by scouts.
  - The best food source found so far is registered.
- UNTIL (requirements are met)

The number of the employed bees is equal to the number of solutions in the population. At the first step, a randomly distributed initial population (food source positions) is generated. After initialization, the algorithm repeatedly performs the search proceses associated with employed, onlooker, and scout bees.

An employed bee produces a modification on the source position in her memory and discovers a new food source position. Provided that the nectar amount of the new one is higher than that of the previous source, the bee memorizes the new source position and forgets the old one; otherwise she keeps the position of the one in her memory.

After all employed bees complete the search process, they share the position information of the sources with the onlookers on the dance area. Each onlooker evaluates the nectar information taken from all employed bees and then chooses a food source depending on the nectar amounts of sources. As in the case of the employed bee, she produces a modification on the source position in her memory and checks its nectar amount. If its nectar is higher than that of the previous one, the bee memorizes the new position and forgets the old one. Abandoned food sources are identified and replaced with new sources generated randomly by artificial scout bees.

== Artificial bee colony algorithm ==
Artificial bee colony (ABC) algorithm is an optimization technique that simulates the foraging behavior of honey bees, and has been successfully applied to various practical problems. ABC belongs to the group of swarm intelligence algorithms and was proposed by Karaboga in 2005.

A set of honey bees, called swarm, can successfully accomplish tasks through social cooperation. In the ABC algorithm, there are three types of bees: employed bees, onlooker bees, and scout bees. The employed bees search food around the food source in their memory; meanwhile they share the information of these food sources to the onlooker bees. The onlooker bees tend to select good food sources from those found by the employed bees. The food source that has higher quality (fitness) will have a large chance to be selected by the onlooker bees than the one of lower quality. The scout bees are translated from a few employed bees, which abandon their food sources and search new ones.

In the ABC algorithm, the first half of the swarm consists of employed bees, and the second half constitutes the onlooker bees.

The ABC generates a randomly distributed initial population of SN solutions (food sources), where SN denotes the swarm size.

Let $X_i=\{x_{i,1},x_{i,2},\ldots,x_{i,n}\}$ represent the $i^{th}$ solution in the swarm, where $n$ is the dimension size.

Each employed bee $X_{i}$ generates a new candidate solution $V_{i}$ in the neighborhood of its present position as equation below:

$v_{i,k} = x_{i,k}+\Phi_{i,k}\times (x_{i,k}-x_{j,k})$

where $X_j$ is a randomly selected candidate solution ($i\neq j$), $k$ is a random dimension index selected from the set $\{1,2,\ldots,n\}$, and $\Phi_{i,k}$ is a random number within $[-1,1]$. Once the new candidate solution $V_i$ is generated, a greedy selection is used. If the fitness value of $V_i$ is better than that of its parent $X_i$, then update $X_i$ with $V_i$; otherwise keep $X_i$ unchanged. After all employed bees complete the search process; they share the information of their food sources with the onlooker bees through waggle dances. An onlooker bee evaluates the nectar information taken from all employed bees and chooses a food source with a probability related to its nectar amount. This probabilistic selection is really a roulette wheel selection mechanism which is described as equation below:

$P_i=\frac{\mathrm {fit}_i}{\sum_j{\mathrm {fit}_j}}$

where $\mathrm {fit}_i$ is the fitness value of the $i^{th}$ solution in the swarm. As seen, the better the solution $i$, the higher the probability of the $i^{th}$ food source selected. If a position cannot be improved over a predefined number (called limit) of cycles, then the food source is abandoned. Assume that the abandoned source is $X_i$, and then the scout bee discovers a new food source to be replaced with $i^{th}$ as equation below:

$x_{i,k}=lb_k+\Phi_{i,k}\times(ub_k-lb_k)$

where $\Phi_{i,k}=\mathrm {rand}(0,1)$ is a random number within$[0,1]$ based on a normal distribution, and $lb_k, ub_k$ are lower and upper boundaries of the $k^{th}$ dimension, respectively.

== See also ==
- Evolutionary computation
- Evolutionary multi-modal optimization
- Particle swarm optimization
- Swarm intelligence
- Bees algorithm
- Fish School Search
- List of metaphor-based metaheuristics
