= Rastrigin function =

Function used as a performance test problem for optimization algorithms

Rastrigin function of two variables

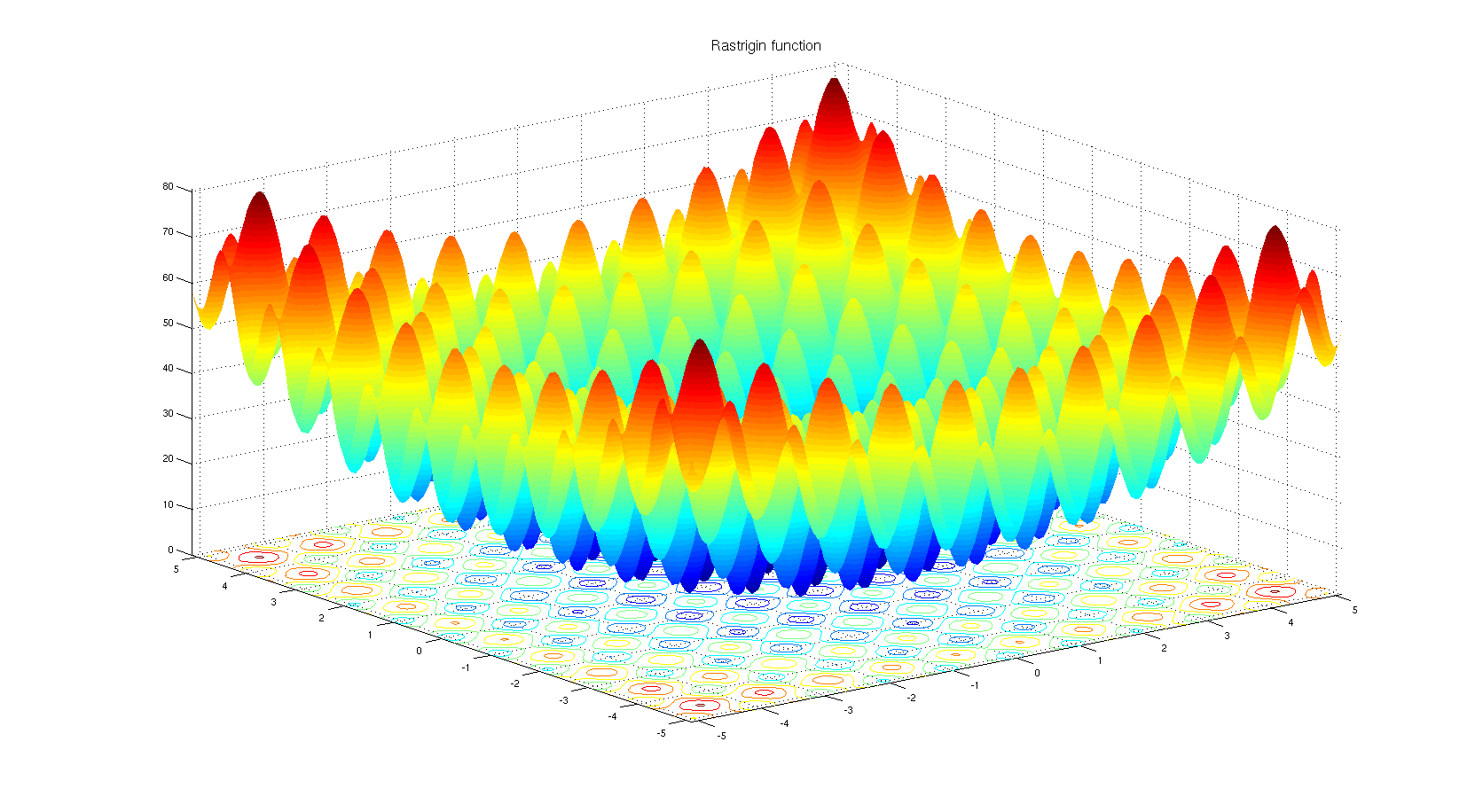
In 3D

Contour

In mathematical optimization, the Rastrigin function is a non-convex function used as a performance test problem for optimization algorithms. It is a typical example of non-linear multimodal function. It was first proposed in 1974 by Rastrigin as a 2-dimensional function and has been generalized by Rudolph. The generalized version was popularized by Hoffmeister & Bäck and Mühlenbein et al. Finding the minimum of this function is a fairly difficult problem due to its large search space and its large number of local minima.

On an $n$-dimensional domain it is defined by:

$$f(\mathbf{x}) = A n + \sum_{i=1}^n \left[x_i^2 - A\cos(2 \pi x_i)\right]$$

where $A=10$ and $x_i\in[-5.12,5.12]$. There are many extrema:

- The global minimum is at $\mathbf{x} = \mathbf{0}$ where $f(\mathbf{x})=0$.
- The maximum function value for $x_i\in[-5.12,5.12]$ is located at $\mathbf{x} = (\pm4.52299366..., ..., \pm4.52299366...)$:

Number of dimensions	Maximum value at $\pm4.52299366$
1	40.35329019
2	80.70658039
3	121.0598706
4	161.4131608
5	201.7664509
6	242.1197412
7	282.4730314
8	322.8263216
9	363.1796117

Here are all the values at 0.5 interval listed for the 2D Rastrigin function with $x_i\in[-5.12,5.12]$:

$f(x)$		$x_1$											
$f(x)$		$0$	$\pm0.5$	$\pm1$	$\pm1.5$	$\pm2$	$\pm2.5$	$\pm3$	$\pm3.5$	$\pm4$	$\pm4.5$	$\pm5$	$\pm5.12$
$x_2$	$0$	0	20.25	1	22.25	4	26.25	9	32.25	16	40.25	25	28.92
$x_2$	$\pm0.5$	20.25	40.5	21.25	42.5	24.25	46.5	29.25	52.5	36.25	60.5	45.25	49.17
$x_2$	$\pm1$	1	21.25	2	23.25	5	27.25	10	33.25	17	41.25	26	29.92
$x_2$	$\pm1.5$	22.25	42.5	23.25	44.5	26.25	48.5	31.25	54.5	38.25	62.5	47.25	51.17
$x_2$	$\pm2$	4	24.25	5	26.25	8	30.25	13	36.25	20	44.25	29	32.92
$x_2$	$\pm2.5$	26.25	46.5	27.25	48.5	30.25	52.5	35.25	58.5	42.25	66.5	51.25	55.17
$x_2$	$\pm3$	9	29.25	10	31.25	13	35.25	18	41.25	25	49.25	34	37.92
$x_2$	$\pm3.5$	32.25	52.5	33.25	54.5	36.25	58.5	41.25	64.5	48.25	72.5	57.25	61.17
$x_2$	$\pm4$	16	36.25	17	38.25	20	42.25	25	48.25	32	56.25	41	44.92
$x_2$	$\pm4.5$	40.25	60.5	41.25	62.5	44.25	66.5	49.25	72.5	56.25	80.5	65.25	69.17
$x_2$	$\pm5$	25	45.25	26	47.25	29	51.25	34	57.25	41	65.25	50	53.92
$x_2$	$\pm5.12$	28.92	49.17	29.92	51.17	32.92	55.17	37.92	61.17	44.92	69.17	53.92	57.85

The abundance of local minima underlines the necessity of a global optimization algorithm when needing to find the global minimum. Local optimization algorithms are likely to get stuck in a local minimum.

== See also ==
- Test functions for optimization
